= Baekhyun discography =

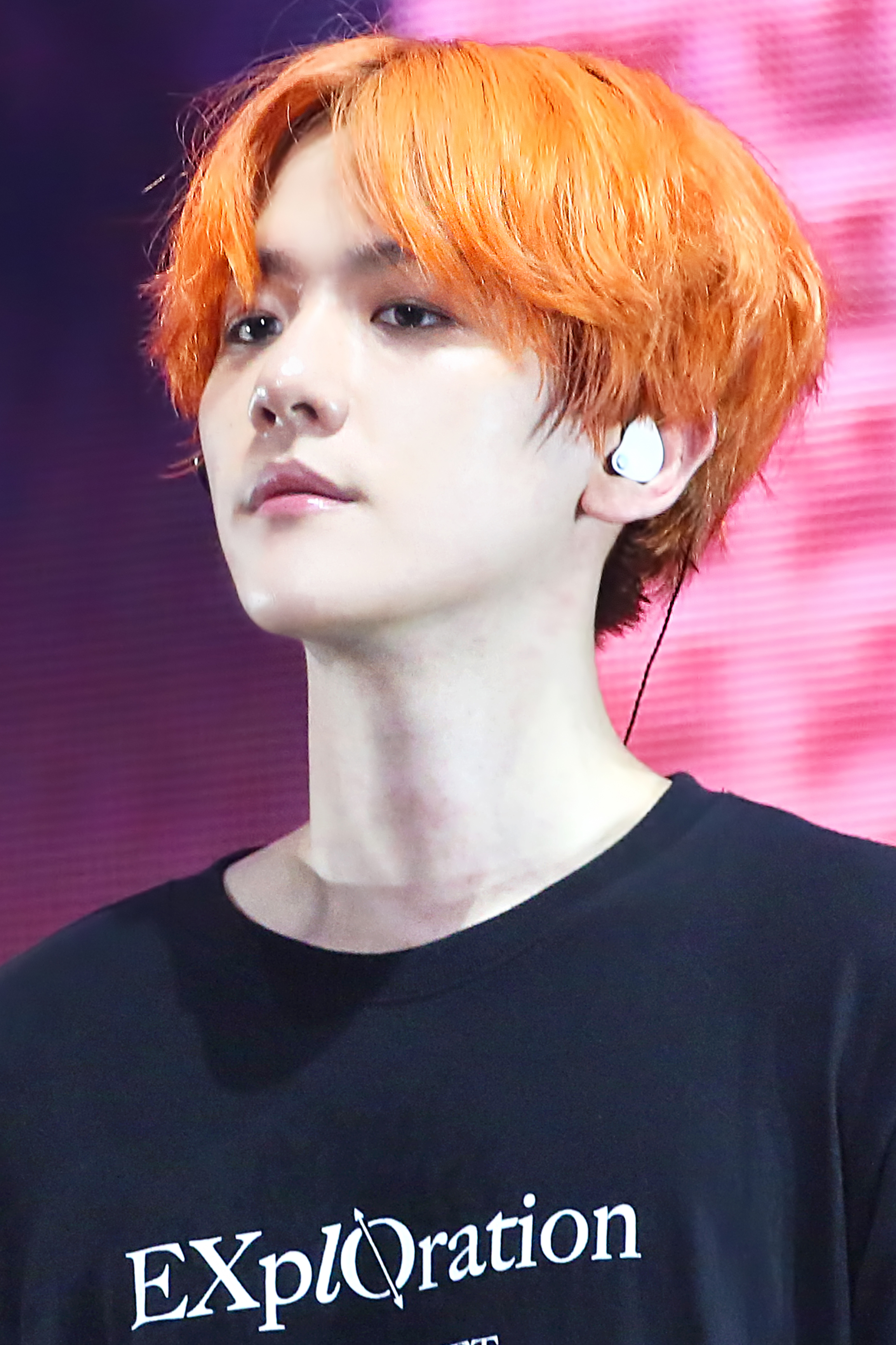
- Baekhyun during the Exo Planet #5 – Exploration concert in Seoul on July 19, 2019.
- EPs: 5
- Singles: 15
- Music videos: 12
- Promotional singles: 2
- Collaborations: 9
- Soundtrack appearances: 8

The discography of the South Korean singer Baekhyun consists of five extended plays, seven singles, two promotional singles, and two soundtrack appearances. Baekhyun started his musical career as part of the South Korean boy band Exo in April 2012.

In January 2016, Baekhyun and Suzy released a duet titled "Dream". The song quickly reached the top on online real-time music charts and later debuted at number one on Gaon's weekly digital chart. In May 2016, Baekhyun and South Korean singer K.Will released a folk-ballad duet titled "The Day" as part of SM Entertainment's music project Station. In February 2017, Baekhyun and Soyou released the collaborative single "Rain". The song reached number one on every South Korean online music chart, an achievement known as "all-kill", making him the first SM Entertainment artist to achieve "all-kill" in both 2016 and 2017 with "Dream" and "Rain" respectively. In April 2017, Baekhyun released a single titled "Take You Home" for the second season of the Station project. In August 2018, Baekhyun and rapper Loco released a collaboration track titled "Young" for the Station project.

Baekhyun released his first extended play, titled City Lights on July 10, 2019. The EP sold more than 400,000 copies after eight days of pre-orders, and eventually sold over 570,000 copies, which made it the best-selling album by a soloist in the 2010s in South Korea.

On March 25, 2020, Baekhyun released his second extended play, Delight. It was reported that the pre-order sales of Delight had surpassed more than 730,000 copies, making it the most pre-ordered album by a soloist in South Korean history. The album sold over 1,000,000 copies, making it the first album by a soloist in South Korea to do so since Another Days (2001) by Kim Gun-mo.

Baekhyun released his third extended play, Bambi, on March 30, 2021. It was reported that the pre-order sales of Bambi had surpassed 833,000 copies, surpassing his own record making it the most pre-ordered album by a soloist in South Korean history. On April 19, it was announced that the album had surpassed 1 million sales, making it Baekhyun's second album to reach this milestone after Delight.

== Extended plays ==
=== Korean extended plays ===
List of Korean extended plays, showing selected details, selected chart positions, sales figures, and certifications
Title	Details	Peak chart positions										Sales	Certifications
Title	Details	KOR	AUS Dig.	HUN	JPN	LIT	POL	UK Dig.	US	US Indie	US World	Sales	Certifications
City Lights	Released: July 10, 2019; Label: SM Entertainment; Formats: CD, digital download, streaming	1	18	—	14	93	15	52	— (Note: City Lights did not enter the Billboard 200, but peaked at number four on the Heatseekers Album.)	9	4	KOR: 608,561; JPN: 8,000; US: 4,000	KMCA: 2× Platinum
Delight	Released: May 25, 2020; Label: SM Entertainment; Formats: CD, Kit, digital download, streaming	1	—	30	9	—	23	11	— (Note: Delight did not enter the Billboard 200, but peaked at number 13 on the Heatseekers Album.)	—	5	KOR: 1,031,993; JPN: 9,778	KMCA: Million
Bambi	Released: March 30, 2021; Label: SM Entertainment; Formats: CD, digital download, streaming	1	—	—	8	—	—	34	—	—	15	KOR: 1,008,850; JPN: 1,267	KMCA: Million
Hello, World	Released: September 6, 2024; Label: INB100; Formats: CD, digital download, streaming	1	—	—	28	—	—	86	—	—	—	WW: 1,400,000; KOR: 1,245,318; JPN: 1,654	KMCA: Million
Essence of Reverie	Released: May 19, 2025; Label: INB100; Formats: CD, digital download, streaming; Track listing: 1. "Chocolate"; 2. "Elevator"; 3. "Lemonade"; 4. "Love Comes Back"; 5. "No Problem"; 6. "Black Dreams"; 7. "Late Night Calls"	3	—	—	—	—	—	—	121	19	1	KOR: 991,356	KMCA: 2× Platinum
"—" denotes releases that did not chart or were not released in that region.

=== Japanese extended plays ===
List of Japanese extended plays, showing selected details, selected chart positions, sales figures, and certifications
Title	Details	Peak chart positions	Sales	Certifications
Title	Details	JPN	Sales	Certifications
Baekhyun	Released: January 20, 2021; Label: Avex Trax; Formats: CD, digital download, streaming	2	JPN: 51,136	RIAJ: Gold

== Single albums ==
Title	Details	Peak chart positions	Sales
Title	Details	KOR	Sales
Dream (with Suzy)	Released: January 7, 2016; Label: SM, JYP, Mystic, LOEN, ICS; Formats: CD, digital download, streaming	1	KOR: 36,900

== Singles ==
=== As lead artist ===
List of singles, with chart positions, showing year released, sales and album name
Title	Year	Peak chart positions			Sales	Album
Title	Year	KOR	JPN Hot	US World	Sales	Album
"Dream" (with Suzy)	2016	1	—	3	KOR: 1,360,267	Dream
"The Day" (with K.Will)	2016	8	—	21	KOR: 351,025	SM Station Season 1
"Rain" (비가와) (with Soyou)	2017	2	—	—	KOR: 823,022	Non-album single
"Take You Home" (바래다줄게)	2017	12	—	5	KOR: 400,795; US: 2,000	SM Station Season 2
"Young" (with Loco)	2018	11	—	4	US: 2,000	SM Station X 0
"UN Village"	2019	22	—	23		City Lights
"Candy"	2020	4	32	16		Delight
"Amusement Park" (놀이공원)	2020	44	—	10		Bambi
"Get You Alone"	2021	—	—	14		Baekhyun
"Runner" (with Changmo and Raiden)	2021	124	—	—		Non-album single
"Doll" (인형) (with Doyoung)	2021	129	—	—		Rewind: Blossom
"Bambi"	2021	14	—	10		Bambi
"Hurt" (with Seomoon Tak)	2021	—	—	21		Non-album single
"Pineapple Slice"	2024	69	—	—		Hello, World
"Do What You Do" (with Umi and El Capitxn)	2025	— (Note: "Do What You Do" did not chart on the Circle Digital Chart but peaked at number 32 on the Download Chart.)	—	—		Non-album single
"Chocolate"	2025	195	—	—		Essence of Reverie
"Elevator"	2025	85	—	—		Essence of Reverie
"—" denotes releases that did not chart or were not released in that region.

=== As featured artist ===
List of singles as featured artist, with chart positions, showing year released and album name
Title	Year	Peak chart positions	Album
Title	Year	KOR	Album
"Leo" (나비와 고양이) (Bol4 featuring Baekhyun)	2020	2	Puberty Book II Pum
"When Dawn Comes Again" (또 새벽이 오면) (Colde featuring Baekhyun)	2021	113	Love Part 2
"Paranoia" (Heartsteel featuring Baekhyun, ØZI, Tobi Lou, Cal Scruby)	2023	—	Non-album singles

=== Promotional singles ===
List of promotional singles, with chart positions, showing year released, sales and album name
Title	Year	Peak chart positions	Sales	Album
Title	Year	KOR	Sales	Album
"Like Rain, Like Music" (비처럼 음악처럼)	2015	40	KOR: 40,638	2015 Gayo Daejun Limited Edition
"Garden in the Air" (공중정원)	2020	83	—N/a	SM Station: Our Beloved BoA

== Other charted songs ==
List of other charted songs, with chart positions, showing year released, sales and album name
Title	Year	Peak chart positions	Album
Title	Year	KOR	Album
"Dream (Club Ver.)" (with Suzy)	2016	46	Dream
"Stay Up" (featuring Beenzino)	2019	89	City Lights
"Betcha"	2019	102	City Lights
"Ice Queen"	2019	114	City Lights
"Diamond"	2019	117	City Lights
"Psycho"	2019	125	City Lights
"R U Ridin'?"	2020	67	Delight
"Bungee"	2020	43	Delight
"Underwater"	2020	62	Delight
"Poppin'"	2020	66	Delight
"Ghost"	2020	68	Delight
"Love Again"	2020	51	Delight
"Love Scene"	2021	88	Bambi
"Cry for Love"	2021	107	Bambi
"All I Got"	2021	108	Bambi
"Privacy"	2021	110	Bambi
"Rendez-Vous"	2024	— (Note: "Rendez-Vous" did not enter Circle Digital Chart but peaked at number 20 on Circle Download Chart)	Hello, World
"Good Morning"	2024	— (Note: "Good Morning" did not enter Circle Digital Chart but peaked at number 21 on Circle Download Chart)	Hello, World
"Cold Heart"	2024	— (Note: "Cold Heart" did not enter Circle Digital Chart but peaked at number 23 on Circle Download Chart)	Hello, World
"Woo"	2024	— (Note: "Woo" did not enter Circle Digital Chart but peaked at number 24 on Circle Download Chart)	Hello, World
"Truth Be Told"	2024	— (Note: "Truth Be Told" did not enter Circle Digital Chart but peaked at number 25 on Circle Download Chart)	Hello, World
"Lemonade"	2025	— (Note: "Lemonade" did not enter Circle Digital Chart but peaked at number 18 on Circle Download Chart)	Essence of Reverie
"Love Comes Back"	2025	— (Note: "Love Comes Back" did not enter Circle Digital Chart but peaked at number 22 on Circle Download Chart)	Essence of Reverie
"No Problem"	2025	— (Note: "No Problem" did not enter Circle Digital Chart but peaked at number 23 on Circle Download Chart)	Essence of Reverie
"Black Dreams"	2025	— (Note: "Black Dreams" did not enter Circle Digital Chart but peaked at number 19 on Circle Download Chart)	Essence of Reverie
"Late Night Calls"	2025	— (Note: "Late Night Calls" did not enter Circle Digital Chart but peaked at number 20 on Circle Download Chart)	Essence of Reverie
"—" denotes releases that did not chart or were not released in that region.

== Soundtrack appearances ==
List of soundtrack appearances, with chart positions, showing year released, sales and album name
Title	Year	Peak chart positions		Sales	Album
Title	Year	KOR	US World	Sales	Album
"Beautiful" (두근거려)	2015	7	10	KOR: 415,163; US: 6,000	EXO Next Door OST
"For You" (너를 위해) (with Chen and Xiumin)	2016	5	9	KOR: 608,002	Moon Lovers: Scarlet Heart Ryeo OST
"My Love" (너를 사랑하고 있어)	2020	15	20		Dr. Romantic 2 OST
"On the Road" (너에게 가는 이 길 위에서 (너.이.길))	2020	76	—		Hyena OST
"Every Second" (나의 시간은)	2020	45	—		Record of Youth OST
"Happy"	2020	73	—		Do You Like Brahms? OST
"U"	2021	86	—		Doom at Your Service OST
"Is It Me?" (나인가요 백현)	2021	92	—		Lovers of the Red Sky OST
"Hello"	2023	135	—		Dr. Romantic 3 OST
"—" denotes releases that did not chart or were not released in that region.

== Other appearances ==
List of other appearances, showing year released, sales and album name
Title	Year	Sales	Album
"Dear My Family" (as part of SM Town)	2012	—N/a	I am. OST
"My Turn to Cry"	2014	KOR: 16,969	Exology Chapter 1: The Lost Planet
"The Day We Met" (as part of I Am Korea)	2015	—N/a	Non-album release
"One Dream One Korea" (with various artists)	2015	—N/a	Non-album release
"Dear My Family" (2017 version) (as part of SM Town)	2017	—N/a	Non-album release
"Psycho"	2019	—N/a	Exo Planet #4 - The EℓyXiOn [dot] (Note: "Psycho" was originally released as a track from the album Exo Planet # 4 - The EℓyXiOn [dot] in January 2019, and later included as a bonus track of EP City Lights in July 2019.)

== Songwriting credits ==
All credits are adapted from the Korea Music Copyright Association, unless cited otherwise.

List of songs, showing year released, artist name, and name of the album
Title	Year	Artist	Album	Lyricist	Composer
"Ko Ko Bop	2017	Exo	The War	Yes	No
"Dandelion"	2024	Chen	Door	Yes	No
"Chocolate"	2025	Baekhyun	Essence of Reverie	Yes	No
"Elevator"	2025	Baekhyun	Essence of Reverie	Yes	Yes
"Lemonade"	2025	Baekhyun	Essence of Reverie	Yes	Yes
"Love Comes Back"	2025	Baekhyun	Essence of Reverie	No	Yes
"No Problem"	2025	Baekhyun	Essence of Reverie	Yes	No
"Black Dreams"	2025	Baekhyun	Essence of Reverie	Yes	No
"Late Night Calls"	2025	Baekhyun	Essence of Reverie	Yes	No

== Music videos ==
=== As lead artist ===
Title	Year	Director(s)	Other Artist(s)	Ref.
"Dream"	2016	Unknown	With Suzy	
"The Day"	2016	Unknown	With K.Will	
"Rain"	2017	Unknown	With Soyou	
"Take You Home"	2017	Unknown	—N/a	
"Young"	2018	Unknown	With Loco	
"UN Village"	2019	Lee In-hoon (Segaji Video)	—N/a	
"Candy"	2020	Nuri Jeong (COSMO)	—N/a	
"Amusement Park"	2020	Unknown	—N/a	
"Get You Alone"	2021	SUSHIVISUAL	—N/a	
"Runner"	2021	Unknown	With Changmo and Raiden	
"Bambi"	2021	Woonghui	—N/a	
"Hurt"	2021	Unknown	With Seomoon Tak	
"Pineapple Slice"	2024	Oui Kim	—N/a	

=== Videos of soundtracks ===
Title	Year	Other Artist(s)	Notes
"Beautiful"	2015	—N/a	For the soundtrack of Exo Next Door
"For You"	2016	With Chen and Xiumin	Containing only scenes of Moon Lovers
"On The Road"	2020	—N/a	Containing only scenes of Hyena
"Every Second"	2020	—N/a	Containing only scenes of Record of Youth
"Happy"	2020	—N/a	Containing only scenes of Do You Like Brahms?
"U"	2021	-	Containing only scenes of Doom at Your Service
"Is it me"	2021	-	Containing only scenes of Lovers of the Red Sky

=== Appearances in music videos ===
Title	Year	Artist(s)	Notes
"Twinkle"	2012	Girls' Generation-TTS	—N/a
"Dance with D.O.C"	2014	DJ DOC	Remake for EXO 90:2014

=== Other appearances ===
Title	Year	Artist(s)	Notes
"Dear My Family"	2012	Various	As part of SM Town; Baekhyun does not appear in the music video
"The Day We Met"	2015	Various	As part of I Am Korea
"One Dream One Korea"	2015	Various	—N/a
"Dear My Family"	2017	Various	As part of SM Town; Live performance
