= K.Will discography =

- Studio albums: 4
- EPs: 6
- Soundtrack albums: 14
- Singles: 32

The discography of South Korean singer K.Will consists of four studio albums, six extended plays, and thirty-two singles.

== Studio albums ==
Title	Album details	Peak chart positions	Sales
Title	Album details	KOR	Sales
Left Heart (왼쪽 가슴)	Released: March 6, 2007; Label: Big Hit Entertainment; Formats: CD, digital download	— (Note: Under the Recording Industry Association of Korea (RIAK), Left Heart (왼쪽가슴) debuted and peaked at number 41 on the monthly chart of March 2007.)	KOR: 2,696
Missing You (그립고 그립고 그립다)	Released: November 5, 2009; Label: Starship Entertainment; Formats: CD, digital download	22	
The Third Album	Part 1; Released: October 11, 2012; Label: Starship Entertainment; Formats: CD, digital download	6	KOR: 12,699
The Third Album	Part 2: Love Blossom; Released: April 4, 2013; Label: Starship Entertainment; Formats: CD, digital download	2	KOR: 12,248
The 4th Album	Part.1 [Nonfiction]; Released: September 26, 2017; Label: Starship Entertainment; Formats: CD, digital download	8	KOR: 6,012
The 4th Album	Part.2 [想像; Mood Indigo]; Released: November 6, 2018; Label: Starship Entertainment; Formats: CD, digital download	13	KOR: 5,403
"—" denotes releases that did not chart or were not released in that region.

== Extended plays ==
Title	Details	Peak chart positions	Sales
Title	Details	KOR	Sales
Dropping the Tears (눈물이 뚝뚝)	Released: March 31, 2009; Label: Starship Entertainment; Format: CD, digital download	42	KOR: 1,497 (2011)
My Heart Beating (가슴이 뛴다)	Released: March 10, 2011; Label: Starship Entertainment; Format: CD, digital download	3	KOR: 11,436
I Need You	Released: February 14, 2012; Label: Starship Entertainment; Format: CD, digital download	4	KOR: 12,937
Will In Fall	Released: October 18, 2013; Label: Starship Entertainment; Format: CD, digital download	4	KOR: 8,873
One Fine Day	Released: June 26, 2014; Label: Starship Entertainment; Format: CD, digital download	4	KOR: 7,288
[RE:]	Released: March 25, 2015; Label: Starship Entertainment; Format: CD, digital download	7	KOR: 4,922
All the Way	Released: June 20, 2024; Label: Starship Entertainment; Format: CD, digital download	39	KOR: 3,746
"—" denotes releases that did not chart or were not released in that region.

== Singles ==
=== As lead artist ===
Title	Year	Peak chart positions			Sales	Album
Title	Year	KOR Circle	KOR Hot	US World	Sales	Album
"Left Heart" (왼쪽가슴)	2007	—	—	—		Left Heart
"Will Do" (하리오)	2007	—	—	—		Left Heart
"Love 119" (feat. MC Mong)	2008	—	—	—		Dropping the Tears
"Dropping The Tears" (눈물이 뚝뚝)	2009	—	—	—		Dropping the Tears
"1 Drop Per Second" (1초에 한방울) (feat. Dynamic Duo)	2009	—	—	—		Dropping the Tears
"Chocolate" (초콜릿) (with Mario)	2009	—	—	—		Missing You
"Missing You" (그립고 그립고 그립다)	2009	46	—	—		Missing You
"Hypnosis" (최면) (feat. Outsider)	2009	97	—	—		Missing You
"Present" (선물) (feat. Eun Ji Won)	2010	3	—	—	KOR: 1,767,965	My Heart Beating
"Amazed" (기가 차) (feat. Simon D and Hyolyn)	2011	2	—	—	KOR: 1,041,693	My Heart Beating
"My Heart Beating" (가슴이 뛴다)	2011	1	—	—	KOR: 2,065,053	My Heart Beating
"Speechless" (입이 떨어지지 않아서)	2011	23	—	—		My Heart Beating
"I Hate Myself" (내가 싫다)	2012	2	6	—	KOR: 1,600,959	I Need You
"I Need You" (니가 필요해)	2012	1	2	—	KOR: 2,217,313	I Need You
"We Never Go Alone" (지금처럼)	2012	6	31	—	KOR: 494,590	Non-album single
"Please Don't" (이러지마 제발)	2012	2	1	—	KOR: 2,250,014	The Third Album
"Love Blossom" (러브블러썸)	2013	2	1	17	KOR: 1,237,017	The Third Album
"You Don't Know Love" (촌스럽게 왜 이래)	2013	1	1	—	KOR: 834,448	Will In Fall
"Day 1" (오늘부터 1일)	2014	2	3	—	KOR: 933,619	One Fine Day
"Growing" (꽃이 핀다)	2015	7	—	—	KOR: 716,425	[RE:]
"You Call It Romance" (니가 하면 로맨스) (feat. Davichi)	2016	2	—	—	KOR: 942,439	Non-album single
"Nonfiction"	2017	16	—	—		The 4th Album
"My Star" (너란 별)	2018	93	—	—		The 4th Album
"The Day in December" (12월 그날)	2021	156	—	—		Non-album single
"No Sad Song for My Broken Heart" (내게 어울릴 이별 노래가 없어) (Prod. Yoon Sang)	2024	136	—	—		All the Way
"—" denotes releases that did not chart or were not released in that region.

=== Collaborative singles ===
Title	Year	Peak chart positions			Sales	Album
Title	Year	KOR Gaon	KOR Hot	US World	Sales	Album
"Snowy Village" (눈 내리는 마을) (with After School, Brown Eyed Girls, Kan Mi-youn, Tei, Suki and Ahn Young-min)	2009	—	—	—		Non-album singles
"After the Bus Left" (버스가 떠난 뒤에) (with Miryo)	2010	14	—	—	KOR: 971,637	Non-album singles
"Pink Romance" (with Sistar and Boyfriend)	2011	25	19	—	KOR: 706,353	Non-album singles
"White Love" (하얀 설레임) (with Soyou and Jeongmin of Boyfriend)	2012	6	7	—	KOR: 696,164	Non-album singles
"Even If You Play" (놀아도) (with Chakun)	2013	13	14	—	KOR: 270,935	Non-album singles
"Snow Candy" (눈사탕) (with Sistar and Boyfriend)	2013	13	15	—		Non-album singles
"Perfume" (향수) (with Jeon Woo-sung of Noel)	2013	6		—		Non-album singles
"Peppermint Chocolate" (Mamamoo and K.Will feat. Wheesung)	2014	10	7	—		Hello
"Love Is You" (with Sistar, Junggigo, Mad Clown, Boyfriend and Jooyoung)	2014	10	—N/a	—	KOR: 242,907	Non-album singles
"Softly" (사르르) (with Sistar, Boyfriend, Mad Clown, Junggigo, Jooyoung, Monsta X, Yoo Seung-woo, Brother Su and Exy)	2015	24	—N/a	—		Non-album singles
"Cook For Love" (요리 좀 해요) (with Junggigo, Brother Su and Jooyoung)	2016	23	—N/a	—		Non-album singles
"The Day" (with Baekhyun)	2016	8	—N/a	21	KOR: 231,025	SM Station Season 1
"That's What" (그게 뭐라고) (with Mad Clown)	2016	14	—N/a	—		Non-album singles
"Christmas Day" (크리스마스데이) (with Soyou, Boyfriend, Monsta X, WJSN, Mad Clown, Junggigo, #Gun, Yoo Seung-woo, Brother Su, Mind U, Duetto, Jeong Se-woon and Lee Kwang-hyun)	2017	63	—	—		Non-album singles
"Christmas Time" (벌써 크리스마스) (with Soyou, Boyfriend, Monsta X, WJSN, Yoo Seung-woo, Brother Su, Mind U, Duetto and Jeong Se-woon)	2018	93	—	—		Non-album singles
"—" denotes releases that did not chart or were not released in that region.

=== As featured artist ===
Title	Year	Peak chart positions	Sales	Album
Title	Year	KOR Gaon	Sales	Album
"Music" (Epik High feat. K.Will)	2007	—		Music Is My Life (Part 2)
"I Introduce My Girlfriend" (내 여자 친구를 소개합니다) (Taw feat. K.Will)	2009	—		Non-album single
"We Really Loved Each Other" (우리 정말 사랑했어요) (Navi feat. K.Will)	2010	4	KOR: 1,052,394	Hello
"I'm Sorry I Loved You" (미안해 사랑해서...) (Gilme feat. K.Will)	2010	14	KOR: 945,256	Love Actually
"Barely Alive" (겨우 살아) (The Name feat. K.Will)	2011	20	KOR: 638,413	Non-album single
"Hope It's You" (그대이길 바래요) (Zia feat. K.Will)	2011	3	KOR: 1,483,604	Avancer
"How I Look These Days" (요즘 내 모습) (Yoon Do-hyun featuring K.Will and Tablo)	2014	39		Singing Yoon Do-hyun
"I'm Good" (혼자가 편해졌어) (Elsie feat. K.Will)	2015	66		I'm Good
"Love Affair" (45 rpm feat. K.Will)	2015	98		Rappertory
"—" denotes releases that did not chart or were not released in that region.

== Soundtrack appearances ==
Title	Year	Peak chart positions			Sales	TV series
Title	Year	KOR Gaon	KOR Hot	US World	Sales	TV series
"Dream" (꿈)	2005	—	—	—		A Love to Kill
"Like a Fool" (바보처럼)	2006	—	—	—		Syndrome
"Moon Setting Alone" (혼자 지는 달)	2007	—	—	—		War of Money
"Wish" (소원)	2008	—	—	—		The Great King, Sejong
"Pond of Tears" (눈물연못) (feat. Dynamic Duo)	2009	—	—	—		Wedding Dress (film)
"1 Drop Per Second A Mix" (1초에 한방울 A Mix) (feat. Dynamic Duo)	2009	—	—	—		Boat (film)
"Love Is a Punishment" (사랑은 벌이다)	2009	—	—	—		Brilliant Legacy
"They Can't Love" (사랑한단 말을 못해서)	2009	—	—	—		Soul Special (music drama)
"Not So Far as My Love" (사랑까진 안돼요)	2010	8	—	—	KOR: 1,019,415	Obstetrics and Gynecology Doctors
"Sun" (태양)	2010	83	—	—		The President
"Real Love Song" (리얼러브송)	2011	25	—	—	KOR: 903,164	The Greatest Love
"My Love Is Crying" (사랑이 운다)	2012	13	11	—	KOR: 656,358	The King 2 Hearts
"You Are Love" (사랑은 그대다)	2012	33	19	—		Arang and the Magistrate
"Love Like This" (사랑은 이렇게)	2012	2	10	—		Cheongdam-dong Alice
"Like a Star" (별처럼)	2013	5	1	—	KOR: 723,530	My Love from the Star
"The Only Person" (하나뿐인 사람)	2014	14	—	—		Pinocchio
"Talk Love" (말해! 뭐해?)	2016	1	—	3	KOR: 1,347,821	Descendants of the Sun
"Melting" (녹는다)	2016	8	—	—		Love in the Moonlight
"The Person I Love" (내가 사랑할 사람)	2017	—	—	—		The Emperor: Owner of the Mask
"Beautiful Moment" (내 생에 아름다운)	2018	7	—	—		The Beauty Inside
"Right in Front of You" (네 앞에)	2019	108	—	—		Melting Me Softly
"Beautiful"	2020	110	—	—		Do You Like Brahms?
"Care About You"	2020	152	—	—		Start-Up
"You're"	2021	—	—	—		Lovestruck in the City
"My Love Beside Me"	2021	—	—	—		Oh My Lady Lord
"—" denotes releases that did not chart or were not released in that region.

== Other charted songs ==
Title	Year	Peak chart positions	Album
Title	Year	KOR Gaon	Album
"Hello, Autumn (안녕 가을)"	2017	51	Nonfiction
"Let Me Hear You Say (미필적 고의)" (feat. Soyou)	2017	57	Nonfiction

== Music video ==
Year	Title	Director(s)	Starring	Ref.
2009	Dropping the Tears (눈물이뚝뚝)	Unknown	Yuri of Girls' Generation	—N/a
2009	Miss, Miss, Miss (그립고 그립고 그립다)	Unknown	Lee Chunhee	—N/a
2010	Present (선물)	Unknown	Gikwang of Highlight, Thunder, Dongho, Wang Sukhyun, Jin Jihee	—N/a
2011	My Heart Beating (가슴이 뛴다)	Unknown	IU, Lee Joon, Minwoo of Boyfriend	—N/a
2011	Can't Open Up My Lips (입이 떨어지지 않아서)	Unknown	IU, Lee Joon, Minwoo of Boyfriend	—N/a
2012	I Need You (니가필요해)	Unknown	Ji Changwook, Bora, Yeo Jingoo, Kim Bora	—N/a
2012	Please Don't... (이러지마 제발)	Zanybros	Ahn Jaehyun, Seo Inguk, Dasom	—N/a
2013	Love Blossom (러브블러썸)	APRIL SHOWER FILM	L of Infinite, Dasom	—N/a
2013	You Don't Know Love (촌스럽게 왜 이래)	Zanybros	Chanyeol of Exo, Lee Ho-jung	—N/a
2014	Day 1 (오늘부터 1일)	Vikings League	Park Minwoo, Soyou	
2015	Growing (꽃이 핀다)	Vikings League	Son Hojun, Park Hasun	
2016	You Call It Romance (니가 하면 로맨스)	Zanybros	Hyungwon, Yoon Yejoo, Choi Wonmyung	
2017	Nonfiction (실화)	Mustache Film	Lee Hak Joo	
2018	My Star (너란 별)	Vikings League	Kian 84, Bona of WJSN	
