= Essence of Reverie =

EP by Baekhyun
- Released: May 19, 2025
- Studio: InGrid (Seoul)
- Genres: R&B, K-pop
- Length: 20:56
- Languages: Korean; English
- Labels: INB100; Dreamus
- Producers: Colde; Basecamp

Baekhyun chronology
Hello, World (2024)	Essence of Reverie (2025)

Singles from Essence of Reverie
- 1. "Chocolate" Released: May 15, 2025; 2. "Elevator" Released: May 19, 2025

Essence of Reverie is the fifth Korean-language extended play and sixth overall by South Korean singer Baekhyun. It was released on May 19, 2025, by INB100 through Dreamus and contains seven tracks, including the lead singles "Chocolate" and "Elevator".

== Background ==
On May 12, 2025 said fifth EP Essence of Reverie will be released on various online music sites at 6 p.m. on the 19th.

== Track listing ==
Essence of Reverie track listing
No.	Title	Lyrics	Music	Arrangement	Length
1.	"Chocolate"	Colde; Byun Baek-hyun; Basecamp	Colde; Basecamp; The Fridge Club	Colde; Basecamp	3:04
2.	"Elevator"	Colde; Baekhyun; Yukon; Basecamp	Colde; Basecamp; The Fridge Club	Colde; Basecamp	3:06
3.	"Lemonade"	Colde; Baekhyun; Yukon; Basecamp; The Fridge Club	Colde; Basecamp; The Fridge Club	Colde; Basecamp	2:57
4.	"Love Comes Back"	Colde	Baekhyun; Colde; Basecamp; The Fridge Club	Colde; Basecamp	3:15
5.	"No Problem"	Colde; Baekhyun; Yukon; Basecamp; The Fridge Club	Colde; Basecamp; The Fridge Club	Colde; Basecamp	3:01
6.	"Black Dreams"	Colde; Baekhyun	Jamil "Digi" Chammas; 153/Joombas; Aaron Theodore Berton; Ryan Ogren; Kareen Lomax; Matthew Crawford	Ryan Ogren; Jamil "Digi" Chammas; Theo & the Climb	2:20
7.	"Late Night Calls"	Baekhyun; Yukon	Colde; Basecamp; The Fridge Club	Colde; Basecamp	3:13
Total length:					20:56

== Commercial performance ==
Essence of Reverie sold 991,356+ copies in South Korea. It peaked at number 3 on the Circle Album Chart, number 121 in Billboard 200. number 19 in Independent Albums, and number 1 in Billboard charts.

== Charts ==
Weekly chart performance for Essence of Reverie
Chart (2025)	Peak position
South Korean Albums (Circle)	3
US Billboard 200	121
US Independent Albums	19
US US World	1

== Certifications ==
Certifications for Essence of Reverie
Region	Certification	Certified units/sales
South Korea (KMCA)	2× Platinum	^{991,356}
^{^} Shipments figures based on certification alone.

== Release history ==
Release history for Essence of Reverie
Region	Date	Format	Label
South Korea	May 19, 2025	CD	INB100; Dreamus
Various	May 19, 2025	Digital download; streaming	INB100; Dreamus
