= Ryu Won =

South Korean actress (born 1997)

- Born: Joo Won; November 8, 1997 (age 28); Haeundae, Busan, South Korea
- Occupation: Actress
- Years active: 2015–present
- Agent: JYP Entertainment

Korean name
- Hangul: 주원
- RR: Ju Won
- MR: Chu Wŏn

Stage name
- Hangul: 류원
- RR: Ryu Won
- MR: Ryu Wŏn

Ryu Won (Korean: 류원; born on November 8, 1997), birth name Joo Won (주원), is a South Korean actress. She is best known for her role in the MBC series Missing 9.

== Early life ==
Born Joo Won in Haeundae, Busan, she changed her surname to avoid confusion with the namesake actor, Joo Won. Ryu lived in Busan till she was in third grade of elementary school, then immigrated with her family to the United States.

Ryu stated that she was originally interested in fashion design or art instead of acting. After entering a beauty contest in Los Angeles when she was 17 years old, she got an offer from JYP Entertainment to be a trainee there. Ryu moved to South Korea and started studying acting after graduating from high school at the age of 18.

== Career ==
=== 2015–present: Debut ===
Ryu Won made her debut in the short film Alice: Crack of Season in 2015. In December 2015, Ryu was cast to play in the KBS2's drama Uncontrollably Fond as a wealthy daughter of Yoo Oh-Sung's character, and is a big fan of Kim Woo-Bin's character. She made her small screen debut in July 2016.

In January 2017, Ryu played as a Hallyu actress in the MBC's disaster drama Missing 9. Ryu then starred as the female lead in Exo member Baek-hyun's music video of his single "Take You Home" which was released on April 14, 2017.

In November 2019, Ryu played the role of Mickey on the SBS drama Vagabond as Edward Park's assistant.

== Filmography ==
=== Films ===
| Year | Title | Role | Notes |
|---|---|---|---|
| 2015 | Alice: Crack of Season | Da-joo | Short film |
| 2019 | Peel | Choon Ja | Credited as Angelina Joo |

=== Television series ===
| Year | Title | Role |
|---|---|---|
| 2016 | Uncontrollably Fond | Choi Ha-roo |
| 2017 | Missing 9 | Yoon So-hee |
| 2019 | Secret Boutique | Wi Ye-eun |
| 2019 | Vagabond | Mickey |

=== Web series ===
| Year | Title | Role |
|---|---|---|
| 2017 | Take Care of the Goddess | Han Yeon-sin |

=== Music video appearances ===
| Year | Song title | Artist |
|---|---|---|
| 2017 | "Take You Home" | Baekhyun |
| 2017 | "We tried our best" | Hwang Chi-yeul |
| 2018 | "Going Going" | Jang Wooyoung |

== Endorsements ==
| Year | Brand | Notes |
|---|---|---|
| 2015 | LG U+ "Membership for Me" | Advertisement clip (with Yoon Park) |
| 2016 | NBA Style China | with Got7 |

== Awards and nominations ==
| Year | Award | Category | Nominated work | Result | Ref. |
|---|---|---|---|---|---|
| 2017 | 36th MBC Drama Awards | Best Character Award, Fighting Spirit Acting | Missing 9 | Nominated | |
