= Missing 9 =

2017 South Korean television series

- Genre: Disaster; Suspense; Mystery; Comedy; Drama; Romance
- Created by: Han Jung-hoon
- Written by: Son Hwang-won
- Directed by: Choi Byung-gil
- Starring: Baek Jin-hee; Jung Kyung-ho; Choi Tae-joon
- Country of origin: South Korea
- Original language: Korean
- No. of episodes: 16 + 2 special episodes

Production
- Executive producer: Park Hong-kyun
- Producers: Jung Chang-hwan; Han Se-min
- Production locations: Jeju Province, South Korea; Seoul, South Korea
- Running time: 60 minutes
- Production company: SM C&C

Original release
- Network: MBC
- Release: January 18 – March 9, 2017

Missing 9 (Korean: 미씽나인) is a South Korean television series starring Baek Jin-hee and Jung Kyung-ho. It aired on MBC from January 18 to March 9, 2017, on Wednesdays and Thursdays at 22:00 (KST) for 16 episodes.

== Synopsis ==
During a flight to China, a plane carrying 47 people crashed into an island. Only 12 make it out alive, seven of whom are South Korea's most famous celebrities. Stylist Ra Bong Hee, Former Dreamers leader Seo Joon-oh, fellow members Tae-oh and Lee Yeol, and famous singer and actress Ha Ji-ah. Other famous actress Yoon So-hee, Ji-ah's manager Jung Ki-joon, president of Legend Entertainment Hwang Jae-guk, Secretary Tae-ho Hang, famous reporter Kim Ki-hwan, and pilots Park seo Tae and Nam Soo Cheol. However, after four months, only Bong-hee survives. However, she discovers that six other survivors survived. Tae-oh, Joon-oh, Ji-ah, Ki-joon, Jae-guk, and Ho-hang have successfully survived the ordeal and are deemed international celebrities due to it. However, they discover that five of them, Lee Yeol, So-hee, Soo-cheol, Seo-tae, and Ki-hwan, were mysteriously murdered by an unknown assailant, and they struggle to find out who in their group murdered the five.

== Cast ==
=== Main Survivors ===
- Baek Jin-hee as Ra Bong-hee

Joon-oh's new stylist, who left her hometown to pursue her dreams in Seoul. Her first day working ends up in a plane crash and being stranded on an uninhabited island. While living on the island, she proves herself to have good survival skills and often feels responsible for others. After four months, she ends up becoming known as the only survivor and sole witness to the events surrounding the accident.

- Jung Kyung-ho as Seo Joon-oh

A celebrity who is going through hard times after being accused of DUI and instigating a colleague to commit suicide. He was once a leader of a popular idol band, Dreamers, but is now reduced to being a D-list fringe celebrity. Although he acts very bratty and spoiled, he turns out to have more love and forgiveness in his heart than anyone. He's presumed dead after passing out from blood loss, but is revealed to be alive and the last survivor to be identified

- Choi Tae-joon as Choi Tae-ho

He was the bassist of the band Dreamers. After the disbandment, he became an actor and successfully climbed back to the peak of his career with a good and clean image. He was perceived as a rival by Joon-oh and was Ji-ah's secret lover. Unknown to the public, he actually needed someone to sing for him during his days in Dreamer. He reveals a hidden side of himself while surviving on the island. He was involved in the murders that occurred on the island. He's the second survivor to be revealed, and tries to kill all 6 of the survivors to ensure his clean image

=== Supporting ===
==== The Other Survivors ====
- Lee Sun-bin as Ha Ji-ah

The most successful celebrity in Joon-oh's and Tae-ho's management agency, Legend Entertainment. She is charismatic and refreshingly honest to the extent of not being able to understand secret signals and hints and often saying them out loud. She has a disease which only Joon-oh and Ki-joon know, which puts her in mortal danger while being stranded on the island.

- Oh Jung-se as Jung Ki-joon

Joon-oh's manager who has been loyal to him throughout the years. He takes very good care of Ji-ah, where it was subsequently revealed that he did it out of guilt of not being able to save Ji-ah's brother while being a medic in the military.

- Kim Sang-ho as Hwang Jae-guk

President of Legend Entertainment. After the ruckus caused by Joon-oh's scandal, he decided to disband Dreamers. He was perceived as a selfish person mainly because of his title, but proved others wrong when he decided to stay with the others on the island when given an opportunity to escape. However, after he's rescued, he is involved in a car wreck which puts him in a coma and paralyzes him permanently.

- Tae Hang-ho as Tae Ho-hang

Secretary of the president of Legend Entertainment. Very loyal to President Hwang, often seen nagging at him, but is also an easily distressed person. He becomes a witness of a murder in the deserted island, and becomes torn between his conscience and his fear.

==== The Dead ====
- Park Chanyeol as Lee Yeol

He was the drummer and the visual of the band Dreamer. After the disbandment of the band, he developed his composition skills and succeeded as a solo artist. He is known as being kind and friendly and is able to display his strength during the tense and desperate times while surviving on the island. He was murdered by one of his fellow survivors when his head is split open on a rock. Korea presumes him missing, since Tae-oh was the only one who witnessed him get murdered.

- Ryu Won as Yoon So-hee

Known as the Hallyu goddess Actress, she is from Legend Entertainment. After surviving the plane crash she was overwhelmed with anxiety and was suicidal at first. Thus, she did not trust anyone and acted out of selfishness multiple times. After Bong-hee rescued her from a suicide attempt, she eventually decided to face reality and tries to fight for survival along with the rest of the survivors. She was also murdered by one of her fellow survivors.

- Heo Jae-ho as Kim Ki-hwan, One of Korea's most famous reporters who seems to have a good memory and knows events that are crucial to Korea's history. he stalked down one of the celebrities to the plane, but ends up on the island. He manages to get a boat to come to the island, but is murdered afterwards by Tae-ho. He's the only celebrity to not be part of Legend
- Park Seok-tae, Captain of the plane. Survived the plane crash but was severely injured and murdered for the supplies he had in his possession.
- Nam Soo-cheol, first officer of the plane. Survived the plane crash and found a lifeboat which would give the survivors a chance to sail out for help. Died after attempting to row the boat out in the sea during a storm.

==== People related to the Missing 9 ====
- Yang Dong-geun as Yoon Tae-young

Actress Yoon Soo-hee's brother, who is a prosecutor who wants to get to the bottom of his little sister's death.

- Song Ok-sook as Jo Hee-kyung

Head of the Special Investigation Commission who is secretly involved in bribery. Instead of revealing every single details from the survivors' testimonials to the public, she is more concerned about the outcome of public sentiment and only chooses to lie due to taking sides with the one with more influence and power.

- Min Sung-wook as Investigator Oh

Loyal to Chairwoman Jo even though he is against her actions at times. He is revealed to be Chairwoman Jo's nephew, and had affection for Bong-hee.

- Bang Eun-hee as Bong-hee's mother

Trusts and supports her daughter regardless of the malicious media reports about her.

==== Legend Entertainment ====
- Kim Beop-rae as Jang Do-pal

Vice President of Legend Entertainment. It is revealed that he had been eyeing for the President's position after he sabotages President Hwang's return to South Korea and that he is involved in the death of Jae-hyun as well. After the seven survivors are found, he helps Tae-oh to kill every single one of them to become head of Legend and ensure that his and Tae-oh's images are clean. Tae-oh later betrays him, frames him for the crimes, and nearly kills him during a jail transport

- Yeon Je-wook as Shin Jae-hyun

Had been a trainee in Legend Entertainment for seven years. While getting insincere assurances that he would be given a chance to debut, he got frustrated of waiting and singing for Choi Tae-oh and supposedly committed suicide. (Ep. 1, 8, 13-14)

=== Others ===
- Kwon Hyuk-soo as Prosecutor Jo Sung-gook
- Cao Lu as Cai Ming, Chinese member of the girl group Blue Angel. (Ep. 1)
- Park Hee-jin as Teacher
- Kan Mi-youn
- Park Yeong-soo
- Lee Seung-hyung
- Lee Jae-ok as Entertainment Program PD (Ep.1)
- Park Seul-gi as MC (Ep. 1)
- Jung Byung-chul
- Jung Dong-gyu
- Hong Se-joon
- Jang Hee-soo
- Kim Byung-chun as hypnotist
- Lee Sang-hong as reporter Seo Dong-min
- Kim Seul-gi as Secretary Kim
- Byun Woo-jong
- Lee Kyu-seob
- Dong Yoon-seok
- Kim Ki-nam

=== Special appearance ===
- Song Yeong-jae as soldier (Ep.1)
- Choi Jong-hoon as soldier (Ep.1)
- Baek Bong-ki as soldier (Ep.1)
- Jun Won-joo as old woman at senior-citizen center (Ep.1)

== Production ==
The early working name of the drama was Gaia, then changed to Picnic, and then Missing 9. The writer's position had multiple changes from Song Ji-na to Kim Ban-di (who wrote the first script), then Han Jung-hoon (who made revisions to the script and later credited as the series creator) and eventually, Son Hwang-won. Kang Ha-neul was first offered the male lead role but declined due to scheduling conflicts. Kwon Yuri, Lee Hye-ri and Jung Yu-mi were all offered the female lead roles, but also declined.

Filming took place in September, 2016, when the lead roles were not confirmed. First table script reading took place on October 14, 2016, at MBC Broadcasting Station in Sangam, Seoul, South Korea.

== Original soundtrack ==
Missing 9 OST Album

Soundtrack album by Various Artist
- Released: March 13, 2017
- Genre: Soundtrack
- Length: 55:38
- Language: Korean, English
- Label: SM; KT Music
- Producer: Lee Soo-man

No.	Title	Artist(s)	Length
1.	"Can't Say Goodbye (I'm Not Okay)" (안녕 못해 (I`m Not Okay))	Chen (EXO)	03:42
2.	"Kiss or Kill"	Gain (Brown Eyed Girls)	02:50
3.	"When My Loneliness Calls You" (나의 외로움이 널 부를 때)	Punch	05:08
4.	"Blue Water" (Original Ver.)	Various Artists	01:33
5.	"Sunday" (Original Ver.)	Various Artists	01:37
6.	"Blue Water" (Piano Ver.)	Various Artists	01:48
7.	"Rule The Island" (Original Ver.)	Various Artists	02:11
8.	"Mr. Seo" (미스터 서 (Vocal Ver.))	Various Artists	01:38
9.	"Mr. Seo" (미스터 서 (Recorder Ver.))	Various Artists	01:38
10.	"Bonghee" (봉희 (Trumpet Ver.))	Various Artists	02:05
11.	"Remember" (Original Ver.)	Various Artists	01:44
12.	"What`s Next?"	Various Artists	01:07
13.	"Can't Hate" (Guitar Ver.)	Various Artists	01:20
14.	"Evil Comes Home"	Various Artists	01:07
15.	"Sunday" (Tango Ver.)	Various Artists	01:52
16.	"Bonghee" (봉희 (Bossa Nova Ver.))	Various Artists	01:46
17.	"Linga" (Vocal Ver.)	Various Artists	02:00
18.	"Remember" (Vocal Ver.)	Various Artists	02:30
19.	"Missing 9" (Trombone Ver.)	Various Artists	01:45
20.	"Midnight of Waltz" (섬의 왈츠 (Original Ver.))	Various Artists	02:02
21.	"There Will Be"	Various Artists	02:58
22.	"Play Me"	Various Artists	02:37
23.	"Sterling" (Opening Title)	Various Artists	02:06
24.	"Deep Wave"	Various Artists	02:15
25.	"Tima"	Various Artists	02:22
26.	"Nine Tears" (아홉 개의 눈물)	Various Artists	01:57
Total length:			55:38

OST Part 1–3

=== Part 1 ===
 (Part of SM Station)

No.	Title	Lyrics	Music	Artist	Length
1.	"When My Loneliness Calls You" (나의 외로움이 널 부를 때)	Jo Dong-hee	Jo Dong-ik	Punch	05:09
2.	"When My Loneliness Calls You" (Radio Edit)	Jo Dong-hee	Jo Dong-ik	Punch	04:23
3.	"When My Loneliness Calls You" (Inst.)		Jo Dong-ik		05:09
Total length:					14:41

=== Part 2 ===
No.	Title	Lyrics	Music	Artist	Length
1.	"I'm Not Okay" (안녕 못해)	Min Yeon-jae	Megatone, Stereo 14, Lee Dong-gun	Chen (EXO)	03:42
2.	"I'm Not Okay" (Inst.)		Megatone, Stereo 14, Lee Dong-gun		03:42
Total length:					07:24

=== Part 3 ===
No.	Title	Lyrics	Music	Artist	Length
1.	"Kiss Or Kill"	Kenzie, Nile Lee	Darius Ginn Jr., Jonathan Buice, Mario Jefferson, Nikki Flores	Gain (Brown Eyed Girls)	02:50
2.	"Kiss Or Kill" (Inst.)		Darius Ginn Jr., Jonathan Buice, Mario Jefferson, Nikki Flores		02:50
Total length:					05:40

=== Charted songs ===
Chart performance

Title	Year	Peak chart positions	Sales	Remarks
Title	Year	KOR Gaon	Sales	Remarks
"I'm Not Okay" (Chen (EXO))	2017	21	KOR: 109,044+	Part 2

== Ratings ==
- In the table below, the blue numbers represent the lowest ratings and the red numbers represent the highest ratings.
- NR denotes that the drama did not rank in the top 20 daily programs on that date.
- N/A denotes that the rating is not known.

Episode #	Date	Average audience share			
Episode #	Date	TNmS Ratings		AGB Nielsen	
Episode #	Date	Nationwide	Seoul National Capital Area	Nationwide	Seoul National Capital Area
1	January 18, 2017	5.6% (NR)	6.4% (NR)	6.5% (NR)	6.9% (19th)
2	January 19, 2017	5.5% (NR)	5.7% (NR)	5.8% (NR)	6.4% (19th)
3	January 25, 2017	4.6% (NR)	5.5% (NR)	4.7% (NR)	5.6% (NR)
4	January 26, 2017	6.0% (NR)	7.0% (NR)	5.3% (NR)	6.3% (NR)
5	February 1, 2017	5.3% (NR)	5.6% (NR)	4.8% (NR)	5.1% (NR)
6	February 2, 2017	6.2% (NR)	6.3% (NR)	4.8% (NR)	4.9% (NR)
7	February 8, 2017	5.8% (NR)	6.8% (NR)	3.8% (NR)	4.8% (NR)
8	February 9, 2017	4.6% (NR)	5.6% (NR)	4.4% (NR)	5.4% (NR)
9	February 15, 2017	4.7% (NR)	5.1% (NR)	4.0% (NR)	4.4% (NR)
10	February 16, 2017	4.8% (NR)	5.7% (NR)	4.3% (NR)	5.2% (NR)
11	February 22, 2017	5.1% (NR)	5.5% (NR)	4.1% (NR)	4.5% (NR)
12	February 23, 2017	5.8% (NR)	6.0% (NR)	4.6% (NR)	4.8% (NR)
13	March 1, 2017	4.6% (NR)	5.1% (NR)	3.9% (NR)	4.4% (NR)
14	March 2, 2017	4.5% (NR)	4.6% (NR)	3.6% (NR)	3.7% (NR)
15	March 8, 2017	4.4% (NR)	4.5% (NR)	4.0% (NR)	4.1% (NR)
16	March 9, 2017	4.8% (NR)	5.1% (NR)	4.2% (NR)	4.5% (NR)
Average		5.1%	5.6%	4.6%	5.1%
Special	January 12, 2017	2.5% (NR)	—N/a	2.7% (NR)	—N/a
Special	January 26, 2017	6.1% (NR)	—N/a	4.3% (NR)	—N/a

== International broadcast ==
The drama started airing in Singapore, Malaysia, Indonesia and Hong Kong on Oh!K every Thursday and Friday at 19:50 from January 19, 2017, to March 10, 2017.

In Thailand, the drama started airing from May 13, 2017, to June 18, 2017, on Channel 7 every Saturday and Sunday at 09:45.

"Missing 9" started airing in Japan on WOWOW every Sunday at 21:00 from June 4, 2017.

In India, the drama started airing from Nov 21, 2024 on MX Player with hindi Dubbed Episodes.

== Awards and nominations ==
Year	Award	Category	Recipient	Result	Ref.
2017	36th MBC Drama Awards				
2017	36th MBC Drama Awards	Drama of the Year	Missing 9	Nominated	
2017	36th MBC Drama Awards	Top Excellence Award, Actress (Miniseries)	Baek Jin-hee	Nominated	
2017	36th MBC Drama Awards	Excellence Award, Actor (Miniseries)	Choi Tae-joon	Nominated	
2017	36th MBC Drama Awards	Golden Acting Award, Actor (Miniseries)	Oh Jung-se	Won	
2017	36th MBC Drama Awards	Best New Actress	Lee Sun-bin	Won	
2017	36th MBC Drama Awards	Best Character Award, Best Villain	Choi Tae-joon	Won	
2017	36th MBC Drama Awards	Best Character Award, Fighting Spirit Acting	Ryu Won	Nominated	
2017	36th MBC Drama Awards	Best Character Award, Comic Character	Jung Kyung-ho	Won	
