= Re:Fresh =

2018 K-pop EP by Soyou

EP by Soyou
- Released: October 4, 2018
- Genre: K-pop
- Length: 20:26
- Label: Starship; LOEN

Soyou chronology
Re:Born (2017)	Re:Fresh (2018)	Day & Night (2022)

Singles from Re:Fresh
- 1. "All Night" Released: October 4, 2018

Re:Fresh is the second extended play by South Korean singer Soyou. It was released by Starship Entertainment and distributed by LOEN Entertainment on October 4, 2018.

== Release ==
The EP was released on October 4, 2018, through several music portals, including MelOn and iTunes.

== Commercial performance ==
Re:Fresh debuted and peaked at number 19 on the Gaon Album Chart, on the week of October 6, 2018, dropping the chart the following week.

== Track listing ==
Digital download
No.	Title	Lyrics	Music	Arrangement	Length
1.	"All Night" (feat. Sik-K)	JQ; Kang Eun-yu; Mola; Lee Ji-won; Kim Jin; Sik-K	GroovyRoom; Oreo	GroovyRoom	3:11
2.	"Decrescendo"	Armadillo	Armadillo	Armadillo	3:57
3.	"When I'm with You"	DAVII	DAVII	DAVII	3:34
4.	"Funny"	e.one; SEION	e.one; SEION	e.one; SEION	3:09
5.	"Shadows"	Soyou; Yu Jin-kyung	Yu Jin-kyung; Jimin	Jimin	3:56
6.	"Little Moments"	Yoon Hyun-sang	Yoon Hyun-sang; Soundhood	Yoon Hyun-sang; Soundhood	3:39
Total length:					20:26

== Charts ==
Chart (2018)	Peak position
South Korea (Gaon)	19
