= Re:Born (EP) =

2017 K-pop EP by Soyou

EP by Soyou
- Released: December 13, 2017
- Genre: K-pop
- Length: 23:17
- Label: Starship; LOEN

Soyou chronology
Re:Born (2017)	Re:Fresh (2018)

Singles from Re:Born
- 1. "The Night" Released: December 13, 2017

Re:Born is the debut extended play by South Korean singer Soyou. It was released by Starship Entertainment and distributed by LOEN Entertainment on December 13, 2017.

== Release ==
The EP was released on December 13, 2017, through several music portals, including MelOn and iTunes.

== Commercial performance ==
Re:Born debuted and peaked at number 19 on the Gaon Album Chart, on the week of December 16, 2017. In its second week, the EP fell to number 76 and dropped the chart the following week.

The EP was the 53rd best-selling album of December 2017, with 2,352 physical copies sold.

== Track listing ==
Digital download
No.	Title	Lyrics	Music	Arrangement	Length
1.	"The Night" (ft. Geeks)	Seo Ji-eum; Geeks	Primary; Lee Ka-eun; 1of1	1of1; Primary	4:03
2.	"Grown-Up"	Yoon Jong-shin	Yoon Jong-shin	Song Sung-kyung	3:59
3.	"Still the One"	Baek Ye-rin	Cloud	Cloud	3:36
4.	"We Need Warmth"	Kwon Soon-kwan	Kwon Soon-kwan	Kwon Soon-kwan	4:31
5.	"7" (& MoonMoon)	MoonMoon	MoonMoon	MoonMoon; Itsang	3:08
6.	"I Still" (& Sung Si-kyung)	13	13	13	4:00
Total length:					23:17

== Charts ==
Chart (2017)	Peak position
South Korea (Gaon)	19
