= Choi Tae-joon =

South Korean actor (born 1991)

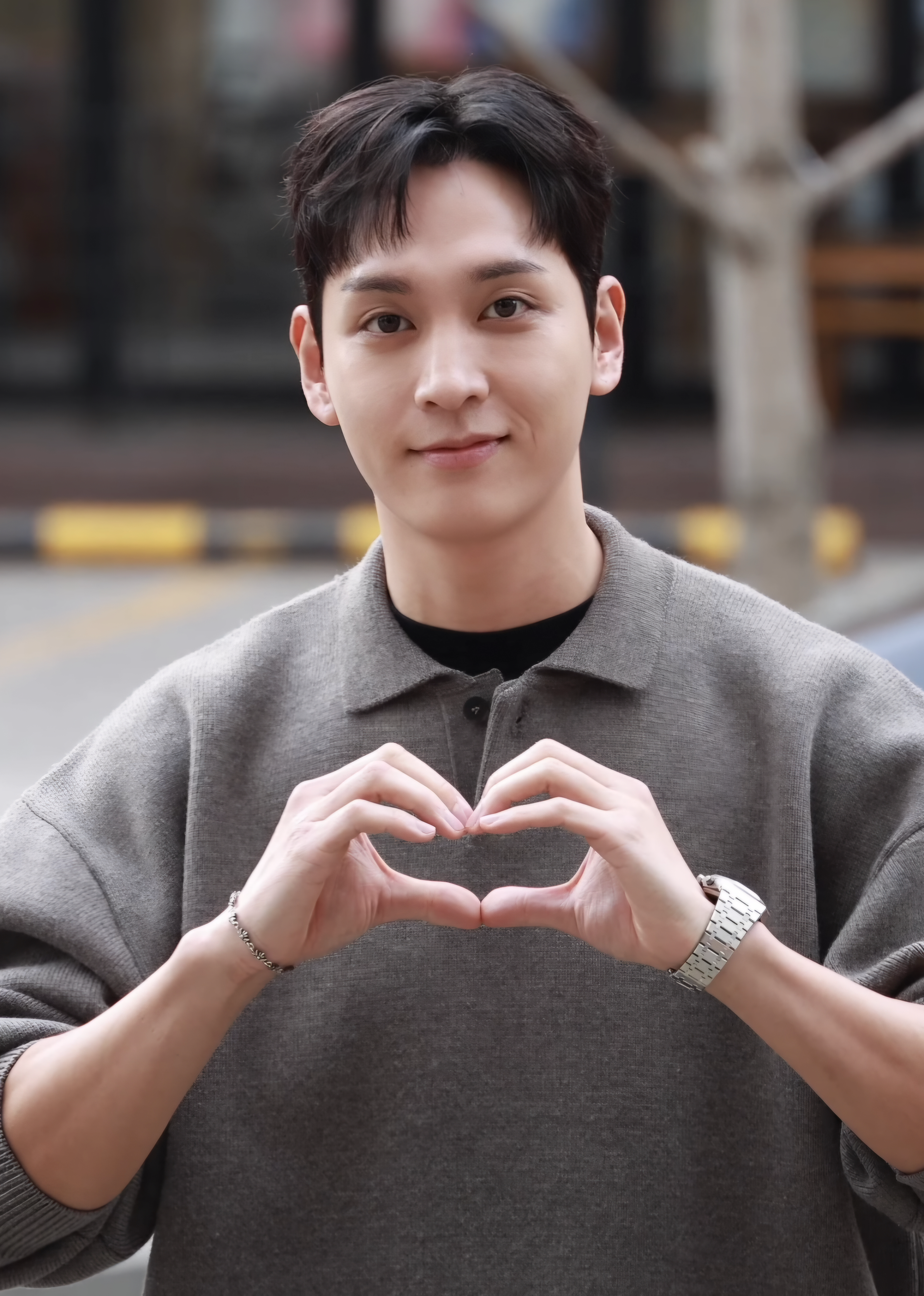
- Choi in January 2025
- Born: July 7, 1991 (age 35); Seoul, South Korea
- Education: Chung-Ang University – Theater and Film
- Occupation: Actor
- Years active: 2001–present
- Agent: Blitzway Entertainment
- Spouse: Park Shin-hye (m. 2022)
- Children: 2

Korean name
- Hangul: 최태준
- RR: Choe Taejun
- MR: Ch'oe T'aejun

Choi Tae-joon (Korean: 최태준, born July 7, 1991) is a South Korean actor and TV host born in Seoul. He first gained recognition as a child actor in the drama Piano (2001), and TV movies about student youth situations. He won two Korea Drama Awards, "Best Young Actor" 2014 for the drama All About My Mom, and "Best Villain" 2017 for his villainous co-star role in the disaster-mystery drama Missing 9. Also, he won another Award for "Best Character" 2017 at the Asia Artist Awards. He has since taken on lead roles in melodrama Exit (2018) and the famous and popular romcom TV drama So I Married the Anti-fan (2021).

== Career ==
Choi made his acting debut as a child actor, playing the younger version of Jo In-sung's character in the television series Piano (2001).

Choi gained recognition with his supporting roles as the protagonist's estranged son in fantasy drama Padam Padam (2011), a 20-year-old high school bully in webtoon adaptation Puberty Medley (2013), a villain in disaster drama Missing 9 (2017), and a lawyer in romance comedy drama Suspicious Partner (2017). Choi also starred in the youth film Eclipse (2016) as the lead.

Choi was a cast member of the virtual reality show We Got Married in 2016, pairing with Apink's Yoon Bo-mi. Choi became a permanent host on the Korean variety show Hello Counselor in September after being a guest two weeks in a row in August 2016. Exclusive contract with Studio Santa Claus Entertainment.

In 2018, Choi was cast in his first lead role on network television in the 2-episode drama special Exit. He was then cast in the romantic comedy series So I Married the Anti-fan as the male lead, based on the webtoon of the same name.

== Personal life ==
=== Marriage and family ===
On March 7, 2018, it was confirmed by Huayi Brothers that Choi had been in a relationship with actress Park Shin-hye since late 2017. On November 23, 2021, it was announced that Park was pregnant and both of them were preparing for marriage. They were married on January 22, 2022, in presence of friends and family in a church ceremony in Seoul. On May 31, 2022, Park gave birth to a son. In April 2026, it was announced that the couple is expecting their second child, with Park giving birth this fall.

=== Military service ===
Choi started his military service along with Bang Yong-guk on August 1, 2019, and served as a public service worker due to health issues. He was discharged from his service on May 18, 2021.

== Filmography ==
=== Film ===
Year	Title	Role	Ref.
2003	Project X		
2012	Pacemaker	Min Yoon-ki	
2016	Eclipse	Se-joon	

=== Television series ===
Year	Title	Role	Notes	Ref.
2001	Piano	young Lee Kyung-ho		
2002	Magic Kid Masuri	Min Ho-soo		
2011	Padam Padam	Im Jung		
2012	The King of Dramas	Oh In-sung, actor in Elegant Revenge	(Bit part, Episode 1)	
2012	The Great Seer	Yi Bang-won		
2013	Ugly Alert	Gong Hyun-seok		
2013	Puberty Medley	Lee Yeok-ho		
2014	Mother's Garden	Cha Ki-joon		
2015	A Girl Who Sees Smells	Ye Sang-gil		
2015	All About My Mom	Lee Hyung-soon		
2016	Flowers of the Prison	Sung Ji-heon		
2017	Missing 9	Choi Tae-ho		
2017	Suspicious Partner	Ji Eun-hyuk		
2018	Exit	Do Kang-soo		
2018	The Undateables	Choi Jun-soo		
2022	Twenty-Five Twenty-One	Jeong Ho-jin	Cameo	
2024	Flex X Cop	Ha Nam-su	Cameo (ep. 9–10)	
2024	The Midnight Studio	Choi Hoon	Cameo (ep. 7-8)	
2024	Iron Family	Cha Tae-woong		

=== Web series ===
Year	Title	Role	Notes	Ref.
2017	109 Strange Things	KDI-109		
2021	So I Married the Anti-fan	Hoo Joon		
2021–2022	The Man's Voice	Baek Tae-hwa		
2023	Island	Chan-hee	Special appearance	

=== Television shows ===
Year	Title	Role	Notes	Ref.
2016	Hello Counselor	Host	Permanent host from episodes 288–341	
2016	Celebrity Bromance	Cast member	Season 2 with Zico (Block B)	
2016	We Got Married	Cast member	Season 4 with Bomi (Apink) (Episodes 341–363)	
2022	Public Diplomacy, Move Your Heart	Narrator	Part 2: Connecting the Heart	

=== Music video appearances ===
Year	Song title	Artist	Ref.
2013	"Bye Bye Happy Days!"	Kara	
2017	"When We Were Two"	Urban Zakapa	

== Awards and nominations ==
Name of the award ceremony, year presented, category, nominee of the award, and the result of the nomination
Award ceremony	Year	Category	Nominee / Work	Result	Ref.
Asia Artist Awards	2017	New Wave Award	Choi Tae-joon	Won	
Asia Artist Awards	2018	Best Icon	Choi Tae-joon	Won	
Asia Rainbow TV Awards	2014	Best Supporting Actor	Ugly Alert	Nominated	
KBS Drama Awards	2015	Best New Actor	All About My Mom	Nominated	
KBS Drama Awards	2015	Best Couple Award	Choi Tae-joo (with Jo Bo-ah); All About My Mom	Nominated	
KBS Entertainment Awards	2016	Rookie Award in Talk Show	Hello Counselor	Won	
MBC Drama Awards	2014	Best New Actor	Mother's Garden	Won	
MBC Drama Awards	2016	Excellence Award, Actor in a Special Project Drama	The Flower in Prison	Nominated	
MBC Drama Awards	2017	Excellence Award, Actor in a Miniseries	Missing 9	Nominated	
MBC Drama Awards	2017	Best Character Award	Missing 9	Won	
SBS Drama Awards	2017	Excellence Award, Actor in a Wednesday-Thursday Drama	Suspicious Partner	Nominated	
