= Exit (South Korean TV series) =

2018 South Korean television series

- Hangul: 엑시트
- RR: Eksiteu
- MR: Eksit'ŭ
- Genre: Science fiction; Melodrama
- Written by: Park Yeon-hyuk
- Directed by: Jung Dong-yoon
- Starring: Choi Tae-joon; Woo Hyun; Bae Hae-sun
- Country of origin: South Korea
- Original language: Korean
- No. of episodes: 4 (Note: In order to circumvent Korean laws that prevent commercial breaks in the middle of an episode, what would previously have been aired as single 70 minute episodes are now being repackaged as two 35 minute episodes, with two episodes being shown each night with a commercial break between the two.)

Production
- Executive producer: Park Hyung-ki
- Camera setup: Single-camera
- Running time: 35 minutes
- Production company: The Story Works

Original release
- Network: SBS TV
- Release: April 30 – May 1, 2018

Exit (Korean: 엑시트) is a 2018 South Korean television miniseries starring Choi Tae-joon, Woo Hyun and Bae Hae-sun. Spanning four episodes, the miniseries features a struggling man who is subjected to a simulated reality in order to gain happiness and evade all of his sufferings. It aired on SBS from April 30 to May 1, 2018, at the 22:00 (KST).

== Plot ==
=== Episodes 1–2 ===
Living a life of sadness and debts, 33-year-old Do Kang-soo (Choi Tae-joon) works as a loan shark in Shinseong Capital for his and his father's sustenance. His mother Lee In-sook (Nam Gi-ae) has long been away from home since when Kang-soo was still a baby due to her husband Do Jung-man's (Woo Hyun) cruelty and drunkenness. Jung-man, now guilty of ruining his family, works for a junk shop despite his old age and declining health. Kang-soo has been trying to look for her mother but was conned by people claiming they can help him in his search. He had also been thinking so much on how to make his and his father's lives better, even contemplating on stealing money from his boss Hwang Tae-bok (Park Ho-san).

Meanwhile, Kang-soo comes across a flyer by Bliss Laboratory with the words Do you ... want to be happy? (당신...행복해지고 싶나요?). He visits the laboratory and meets neuroscientist and researcher Dr. Woo Jae-hee (Bae Hae-sun). Dr. Woo presents her team's invention: a glucose-coated amino acid medicinal capsule combined with a protein from the cerebral artery that is injected to the brain to "maximize the feeling of happiness" and make a human subject believe that all of his/her desires "have come true" within a "perfect world." Dr. Woo takes a tomography of Kang-soo's brain and tells him that he is 96% suitable for the experiment, i.e. he can undergo the test without any problems. When Dr. Woo hands him the contract, Kang-soo decides to decline the offer for his father's sake.

One night at Shinseong Capital, Kang-soo caught his love interest, Tae-bok's 28-year-old girlfriend Ji Sun-young (Jeon Soo-jin), attempting to open Tae-bok's safe. Sun-young, who actually dreams to become a musical actress, does not enjoy her life with Tae-bok. Although he had also been thinking about it, Kang-soo believes stealing the money will not change anything and will even make Tae-bok very furious. Kang-soo drives away with a drunk Sun-young and crashes into an oncoming truck. Kang-soo's father learns of the accident and rushes to the hospital, mourning at the doors of the operating room.

Kang-soo wakes up in the hospital, and realizes that Sun-young has been discharged. Tae-bok gets suspicious of Kang-soo and asks him why Sun-young ended up with him on the night of the accident. Kang-soo decides to return to Bliss Laboratory, but Dr. Woo tells him that, not like before, he has to pay a ₩300,000,000 participation fee due to a rapid increase of participants. The next day, Kang-soo attempts to unlock Tae-bok's safe but he gets caught by Tae-bok. Kang-soo is about to get beaten up by Tae-bok's henchmen when the police arrive to raid the business. As Tae-bok and his men are arrested, Kang-soo sees his co-worker Hong Ki-chul (Kim Kyung-nam) come out of hiding. Suspecting the police stakeout was part of Ki-chul's plan to steal the money, Kang-soo takes all the money in the safe and escapes. He was about to pay his participation fee but upon arriving at Bliss Laboratory's address, the building is already gone. Later, Jung-man reveals to Kang-soo his regrets and that he already had the address where In-sook could recently be living. The father and son reconcile.

Kang-soo receives a call from Ki-chul, telling him that Tae-bok will soon be released due to lack of evidence and requests for them to meet. When he arrives at their supposed meeting place, Kang-soo realizes that Ki-chul had fooled him. He rushes back to his house but finds the money gone; Ki-chul was nowhere to be found. After days of looking for Ki-chul, he watches the news on TV and founds out that Tae-bok has escaped from prison. He is captured by Tae-bok and his henchmen, but as he was about to be buried alive he tells that Ki-chul had stolen the money, just as Ki-chul arrives. Ki-chul hands the bag of money to Tae-bok, but Kang-soo snatches it and runs away, chased by Tae-bok and his men. The police arrive and runs after Tae-bok, but as Kang-soo whispers his wish for Tae-bok to die, a vehicle suddenly drives into the street and runs into Tae-bok, instantly killing him.

Kang-soo becomes very happy and contented over his newfound wealth, and he becomes Sun-young's fiancé. But it is revealed that the "real" Kang-soo is lying in a sleep-like state in a room in Bliss Laboratory with tubes injecting a blue fluid—the "happiness" capsule dissolved in liquid—into his head. Dr. Woo is observing Kang-soo through a window separating Kang-soo and the control room. The scenes starting from Kang-soo waking up in the hospital and onwards were all part of the simulated reality induced by Dr. Woo's capsule. Kang-soo's father is seen in front of Bliss Laboratory's building holding a bracelet with a string of five digits inscribed on it. He sees a seemingly dead body covered in a blanket being brought from the building into a Bliss Laboratory truck. He follows a truck and arrives in an unknown building, where he saw the body being brought into a room. He peeks through the door's window and sees that the dead body, now enclosed in large flames, wore a bracelet like the one he is holding to. With horror, he realizes that he is witnessing one of Bliss Laboratory's dead subjects being burned in a crematorium.

=== Episodes 3–4 ===
The scene goes back to the night of Kang-soo and Sun-young's vehicular accident. Due to severe brain injury, Kang-soo may not live a normal life anymore if he happens to survive. Dr. Woo arrives at the hospital and talks to the grief-stricken Do Jung-man on Kang-soo's chance to be happy. At Bliss Laboratory, Dr. Woo convinces Jung-man to let Kang-soo undergo the experiment, in return for a reward money to be granted to him. With Dr. Woo's assurance and Tae-bok's warning, Jung-man concedes with the testing.

Outside Bliss Laboratory, Jung-man sees a presumably dead body being carried out of the building into a truck. He picks up a bracelet that had fallen from the body. The bracelet have a string of five digits inscribed on it. Meanwhile, Dr. Woo and her team lays Kang-soo on a bed, with small tubes connecting his head to a fluid-filled cylinder. Upon Dr. Woo's signal, the test starts: a "happiness" capsule is dissolved in the cylinder, and the resulting fluid is injected into Kang-woo. The simulated reality (which was revealed in Episodes 1 to 2) starts in Kang-soo's consciousness. Jung-man returns with the bracelet to Bliss Laboratory and sees another body carried into a truck. He follows the truck, and ends up in a crematorium. He realizes that Bliss Laboratory's subjects can actually die from the experiment.

Back to the capsule-induced alternate reality, Kang-soo becomes the CEO of his own company and he is ready to be married to Sun-young. At home, Sun-young asks Kang-soo's father if they have any photos of Kang-soo when he was still young. Keeping his painful past a secret, Kang-soo tells her that his father is too busy to take family pictures, but to his surprise, his father took out a photo album filled with many pictures showing him and his father. Kang-soo also manages to find his mother, who is owning a business by the sea. His mother recognizes him and apologizes for leaving him behind when he was still young.

Meanwhile, in the real world, Jung-man pleads Dr. Woo to let Kang-soo go. He reveals his discovery of the dead subjects, showing her the fallen bracelet. Dr. Woo insists to Jung-man that there is only a 0.1% chance that Kang-soo will perish in the experiment, and if he did die, he would die as a happy person. To Jung-man's shock, he learns from Dr. Woo about Kang-soo visiting the laboratory after reading the message from one of their flyers and declining the offer for Jung-man's sake. Dr. Woo reveals to him that only by the subject's own willpower can the subject force himself out of the simulation. If one is not able to exit, his or her physical activities will eventually stop. And considering the happiness one can experience in the simulation, it may already be too hard for one to exit from the simulation. Devastated, Jung-man asks Dr. Woo to let him see Kang-soo for the last time.

In the simulated reality, Kang-soo's parents are finally reunited. Kang-soo receives a mysterious call telling him to "get out" immediately. He dismisses the call and spends happy times with his parents and Sun-young, taking photos at the seashore. Back at his company, he chases a suspicious hooded man but he loses him, and he suddenly experiences a spell of dizziness. Later, he notices that the scar on his right elbow, which he got when he was still young from one of his father's tantrums, was already gone. Kang-soo starts to feel suspicious. In the real world, the diluted capsule is actually getting used up. Dr. Woo orders to increase the dosage for the test to continue.

In response to the increased dosage, Kang-soo wakes up and finds himself in a new high-rise corporate building. Kang-soo asks Sun-young about the building, and he learns that he had signed a contract and had taken over a larger company as its new CEO. Kang-soo's fears and suspicious grow when, upon asking Sun-young about her dream, she tells him she dreams of owning a building (instead of being an actress). To test her, Kang-soo breaks up with Sun-young and asks her a few seconds later if they could start over again. He expects Sun-young to reject him, but to his surprise, Sun-young easily agreed for them to start over.

Disappointed, Kang-soo gets drunk and falls down. Though he is very dizzy, he saw the hooded man approach him and telling the same warning, to "get out." He wakes up and finds himself back at home in his bedroom with his mother. Upon asking her if she is okay reuniting with his father, she tells him that she had forgiven his father and that, no matter what, Kang-soo will be the most precious to her. His suspicions dominating, Kang-soo then recalls how her mother quickly recognized him, considering that they have never met each other for the past 30 years. Kang-soo becomes dizzy again, with the image of the hooded man and his warning coming back to his mind.

To rid Kang-soo of his suspicions and make him think of going back to the simulation, Dr. Woo temporarily inhibits the flow of the medicine to his brain. This, she believes, will let him experience reality and let him see "what a nightmare his real life has been." In consequence, Kang-soo's mother escapes from home, his father becomes a fourth-stage liver cancer patient, Tae-bok is suddenly resurrected and tries to catch him with his henchmen, and Sun-young changes sides and goes back to Tae-bok. Kang-soo hides in hotel room and mourns over his loss; now, he wishes not to go back to his miserable past. In the real world, Dr. Woo then returns his dosage of the medicine, and the simulation shifts back to normal.

Kang-soo meets the hooded man again, who tells him that there is not much time left and he will not last long the simulated reality. The hooded man pleads Kang-soo to "get out" of the fake reality. Kang-soo unmasks the hooded man, who turns out to be the manifestation of his real father. In the real world, it was at this moment when his father visits him in his room and sobs beside him while holding his hand. He asks for forgiveness, tells him that he loves him, and pleads for him to wake up and look at reality. Back in the simulation, the hooded man disappears and Kang-soo gets dizzy again. He realizes that he is not happy at the fake reality that he is in and he wants to see his real father again. With resolve, he decides to exit from the simulation. Dr. Woo rushes to the control room to increase his dosage, but the Kang-soo in the simulation begins plunging himself into the sea. After three counts, he drowns himself into the water, and the Kang-soo in the real world finally wakes up from the simulation.

Kang-soo, still injured from the accident, limps his way out of Bliss Laboratory. On the way, he sees other subjects still immersed in the simulation, including Sun-young. Before he opens the exit, Dr. Woo confronts him, but he dismisses her, simply telling her that his father likes to eat jokbal. Kang-soo arrives at home and finds his father staring longingly at his mother's photographs. Realizing that Kang-soo is already home, the father and son look at each other with tears of joy.

In the closing scene of the series, a photo studio is shown with a photograph of Kang-soo and his father, encased in a frame, put up on display.

== Cast ==
=== Main ===
- Choi Tae-joon as Do Kang-soo
  - Lee Shi-hoon as young Kang-soo

a 33-year-old employee in Shinseong Capital, a company of loan sharks. He is the son of Do Jung-man, his formerly abusive father, and Lee In-sook, her mother who ran away from home due to Jung-man's cruelty. Due to his father's debts, he is forced to work as a loan shark in Shinseong Capital, under its owner, Hwang Tae-bok. He secretly harbors feelings for Ji Sun-Young, who is Tae-bok's girlfriend.

- Woo Hyun as Do Jung-man

Kang-soo's father and In-sook's ex-husband. He was an abusive father when Kang-soo was still young; he tends to beat up Kang-soo and In-sook, especially when he is drunk. Later, as his debts piled up and his addiction to alcohol lead to him getting sick, he begins to feel remorseful for not being a good father and husband to Kang-soo and In-sook. He is working in a junk shop despite his old age and declining health. He likes to eat jokbal which Kang-soo always serves at dinner for him.

- Bae Hae-sun as Dr. Woo Jae-Hee

a neuroscientist in Bliss Laboratory who leads a team of scientists to develop a glucose-coated amino acid capsule capable of generating a simulated reality driven towards happiness, i.e. a simulation that contains events, situations, circumstances, etc. that will lead to the subject's happiness and contentment.

=== Supporting ===
- Jeon Soo-jin as Ji Sun-young

a 28-year-old woman who dreams to become an actress in musicals. She is Hwang Tae-bok's girlfriend, though she does not enjoy her life with the old load shark.

- Nam Gi-ae as Lee In-sook

Kang-soo's mother. When Kang-soo was still young, she ran away from home due to his ex-husband Jung-man's cruelty.

- Park Ho-san as Hwang Tae-bok

the boss of loan shark company Shinseong Capital.

- Kim Kyung-nam as Hong Ki-chul

Kang-soo's fellow worker in Shinseong Capital.

== Ratings ==
- In the table below, the blue numbers represent the lowest ratings and the red numbers represent the highest ratings.
- NR denotes that the drama did not rank in the top 20 daily programs on that date.

Ep.	Original broadcast date	Average audience share			
Ep.	Original broadcast date	TNmS		AGB Nielsen	
Ep.	Original broadcast date	Nationwide	Seoul	Nationwide	Seoul
1	April 30, 2018	4.8% (NR)	5.6% (NR)	4.8% (NR)	5.7% (NR)
2	April 30, 2018	4.9% (NR)	5.8% (NR)	5.2% (NR)	6.1% (18th)
3	May 1, 2018	3.5% (NR)	4.3% (NR)	4.6% (NR)	5.4% (NR)
4	May 1, 2018	3.9% (NR)	4.7% (NR)	4.6% (NR)	5.5% (NR)
Average		4.275%	5.1%	4.8%	5.675%
