= Take You Home (Baekhyun song) =

Single by Baekhyun
- Released: April 14, 2017
- Recorded: 2017
- Studio: SM LVYIN (Seoul)
- Genre: K-pop
- Length: 3:54
- Label: SM; Genie
- Songwriters: Cho Kyu-man, Honey
- Producer: Cho Kyu-man

Baekhyun singles chronology
"Rain" (2017)	"Take You Home" (2017)	"Young" (2018)

Music video
- "Take You Home" on YouTube

"Take You Home" (Korean: 바래다줄게) is a song by South Korean singer and Exo member Baekhyun. The song was released on April 14, 2017 by SM Entertainment through SM Station Season 2.

== Background and release ==
On March 23, it was revealed that Baekhyun will release a single through SM Station season 2. On April 5, it was confirmed that the single is titled "Take You Home" and will be released on April 14.

Produced by singer Cho Kyu-Man, "Take You Home" is described as a "medium tempo ballad" song. The song tells the story of a man who wants to stay close and protect a heartbroken woman. The single was officially released on April 14.

== Music video ==
On April 7, SM released a prologue of the music video of "Take You Home". On April 12, a teaser of the music video was released. "Take You Home" music video was officially released on April 14. The music video features South Korean actress Ryu Won as the female lead along with Baekhyun himself as the male lead.

== Live performance ==
On July 21, 2018, Baekhyun performed "Take You Home" for the first time live on the first day of the SM Station concert The Station.

== Track listing ==
No.	Title	Lyrics	Music	Arrangement	Length
1.	"Take You Home" (바래다줄게)	Cho Kyu-man, Honey	Cho Kyu-man, Park Won-joon	Cho Kyu-man	3:54
2.	"Take You Home" (Instrumental)		Cho Kyu-man, Park Won-joon	Cho Kyu-man	3:54
Total length:					7:48

== Reception ==
Upon release, "Take You Home" quickly reached the top spots on South Korean and Chinese online music charts. The song debuted as no. 12 on Korea's Gaon Digital Chart, and no. 5 on Billboard's US World Digital Songs.

== Charts ==
=== Weekly charts ===
Chart (2017)	Peak position
South Korean Weekly singles (Gaon)	12
US World Digital Songs (Billboard)	5

=== Monthly charts ===
Chart (2017)	Peak position
South Korean Monthly singles (Gaon)	25

== Sales ==
Region	Sales
South Korea (Gaon)	400,795

== Release history ==
Region	Date	Format	Label
South Korea	April 14, 2017	Digital download; streaming	SM; KT
Various	April 14, 2017	Digital download; streaming	SM; KT
