= Pineapple Slice =

Single by Baekhyun

from the EP Hello, World
- Language: Korean
- Released: September 6, 2024
- Recorded: 2024
- Studio: InGrid (Seoul)
- Genre: R&B; synth-pop
- Length: 3:16
- Label: INB100; Dreamus
- Composers: Eljay; Shakka Philip; TMM; Forever Noh; Dom Rivinius
- Lyricists: Park Tae-won; Shakka Philip
- Producers: Eljay; Dom Rivinius

Baekhyun singles chronology
"Hurt" (2021)	"Pineapple Slice" (2024)	"Chocolate" (2025)

Music video
- "Pineapple Slice" on YouTube

"Pinneaple Slice" is a song recorded by South Korean singer Baekhyun as the lead single of his fourth EP, Hello, World. It was released on September 6, 2024, by INB100 and distributed by Dreamus. This is his first single released under the new agency.

== Background ==
On January 3, 2024, Ten Asia reported that Baekhyun has established a company called I&B 100 as their CEO and added that the company had been established on June 23, 2023. On January 9, Baekhyun commenced solo activities under INB100 alongside Exo-CBX, while Exo activities remain under SM Entertainment. Baekhyun toured Asia as a soloist for the first time through Lonsdaleite Tour starting with a doubleheader in Seoul's KSPO Dome on March 16 and 17.

During the encore concert on July 27, Baekhyun performed unreleased song "Rendez-Vous" and hinted a comeback in September by showing a teaser video of him eating a can of pineapple along with a phrase using a famous line from the movie Chungking Express at the end of the show. On August 11, INB100 confirmed that Baekhyun will release his fourth EP, Hello, World on September 6.

On September 2, "Pineapple Slice" was announced as the lead single through a music video teaser. The music photo was uploaded the following day showing Baekhyun wearing a white t-shirt with leather boots and leather pants.

The song and its music video, along the EP, was released on September 6 through various music streaming services.

== Composition ==
"Pineapple Slice" is an R&B song produced by Eljay and Dom Rivinius. It was composed by Eljay, Shakka Philip, TMM, Forever Noh, and Rivinius that harmonizes a catchy bass line with Baekhyun's more mature vocals. Eljay and Rivinius arranged the song in the key of C major with a tempo of 99 beats per minute.

The lyrics were penned by Park Tae-won and Shakka Philip narrating irresistible charm by comparing it to the sweetest piece of pineapple.

During an interview with Billboard, Baekhyun recalled selecting "Pineapple Slice" as the single and said "I got the feel within the first few seconds that this was the track I wanted to make as my title track. I’d been searching for a song that has a very intriguing instrumental and catches the ear."

== Music video ==
The music video was uploaded on September 6, showing Baekhyun playing a vampire that has his eyes set on a woman before turning her into a vampire as well after biting her nearing the end of the video.

== Critical reception ==
Tanu I. Raj of NME compared the song to Baekhyun's previous single "Candy" and gave "Pineapple Slice" a positive review, calling it "sultry and laced with playfulness and occasional yearning."

== Promotions ==
Baekhyun performed "Pineapple Slice" for the first time during his appearance in KBS2's Music Bank on September 6. He later appeared on MBC's Show! Music Core and SBS' Inkigayo on September 7 and 8 respectively.

== Charts ==
=== Weekly charts ===
Chart performance for "Pineapple Slice"
Chart (2024)	Peak position
South Korea (Circle)	69
US LyricFind Global (Billboard)	22

=== Monthly charts ===
Monthly chart performance for "Pineapple Slice"
Chart (2024)	Peak position
South Korea (Circle)	140

== Credits and personnel ==
Credits adapted from the EP's liner notes.

Studio

- InGrid Studio – recording, digital editing
- Klang Studio – engineered for mix, mixing
- 821 Sound Mastering – mastering

Personnel

- INB100 – executive producer
- Kim Dong-joon – executive supervisor
- Byun Baek-hyun – vocals
- Eljay – producer, composition, arrangement
- Dom Rivinius – producer, composition, arrangement
- Shakka Philip – lyrics, composition, background vocals
- TMM – composition
- Forever Noh – composition
- Park Tae-won – Korean lyrics
- Pollen – vocal directing
- Jeong Eun-kyung – recording, digital editing
- Sun Yang-in – recording
- Eom Se-won – engineered for mix
- Koo Jong-pil – mixing
- Kwon Nam-woo – mastering

== Release history ==
Release history and formats for "Pineapple Slice"
Region	Date	Format	Label
Various	September 6, 2024	Digital download; streaming	INB100; Dreamus
