= Soyou =

South Korean singer (born 1992)

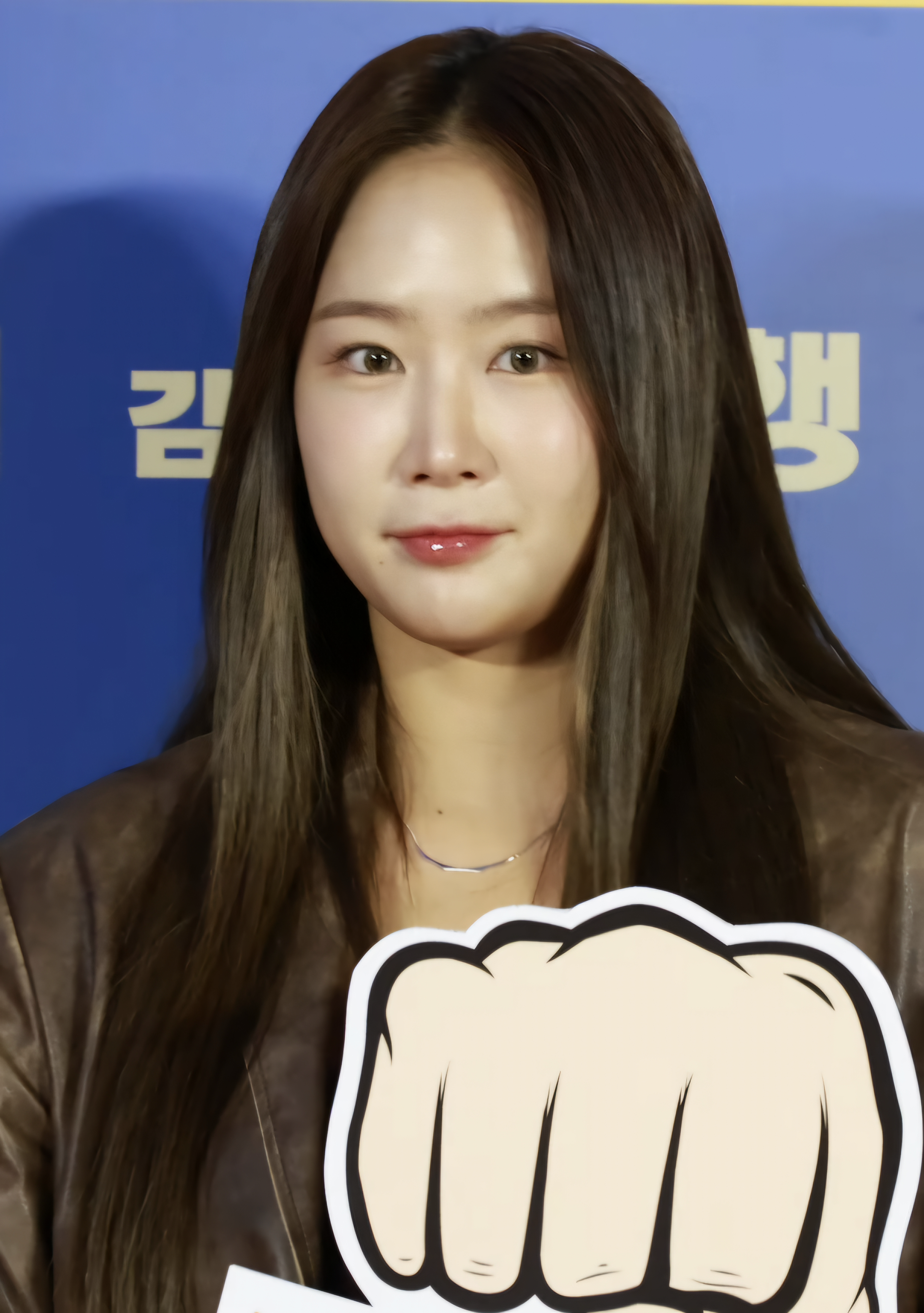
- Soyou in April 2024
- Born: Kang Ji-hyun; February 12, 1992 (age 34); Jeju Island, South Korea
- Occupation: Singer
- Musical career
- Genres: K-pop; R&B
- Instrument: Vocals
- Years active: 2010–present
- Labels: Starship; BPM; Magic Strawberry Sound
- Formerly of: Sistar

Korean name
- Hangul: 강지현
- Hanja: 姜知賢
- RR: Gang Jihyeon
- MR: Kang Chihyŏn

Stage name
- Hangul: 소유
- Hanja: 韶宥
- RR: Soyu
- MR: Soyu

Signature
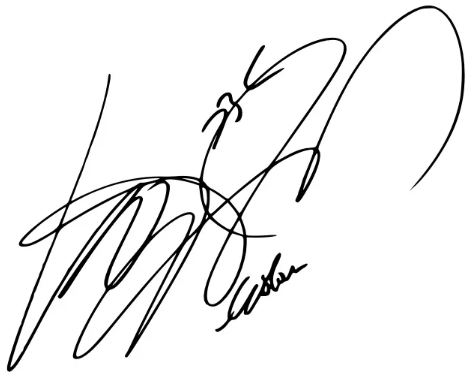

Kang Ji-hyun (Korean: 강지현; born February 12, 1992), known professionally as Soyou (소유), is a South Korean singer. She is best known as a former member of the South Korean girl group Sistar.

== Early life and education ==
Soyou was born on February 12, 1992, in Jeju Island, South Korea. Before debuting, she was a licensed hairdresser and worked in a hair salon. Soyou was known as a Cube Entertainment trainee, who was originally supposed to debut as a member of 4Minute. Soyou has said that she didn't make it into the group because she was lacking in many ways and was originally supposed to be in Sohyun's place. Instead, Soyou auditioned for Starship Entertainment, singing a cover of Navi's "On The Road", and after her traineeship, she debuted as a member of Sistar in June 2010. The group gained significant popularity after the release of their hit single "So Cool" in 2011.

Soyou pursued her middle school at Mullae Middle School and completed high school at the Korean Arts High School with a specialization in theater and film. In 2012, she earned her Bachelor of Arts in Contemporary Applied Music degree from Sungshin Women's University.

== Career ==
=== 2010–2017: Original soundtracks, collaborations and Sistar disbandment ===
In August 2010, Soyou collaborated with Kan Jongwoo of J2 for the soundtrack for the drama Gloria. In September, she also sang a soundtrack for MBC's drama Playful Kiss. The song is titled "Should I Confess".

In November 2012, Soyou sang a duet with hip-hop duo Geeks. The song "Officially Missing You, Too" is a remake of Tamia's song of the same title. It is a part of Geeks' project album, Re;Code Episode 1. She also collaborated with fellow label mates, K.Will and Boyfriend's Jeongmin, for Starship Planet's yearly holiday release, titled "White Love".

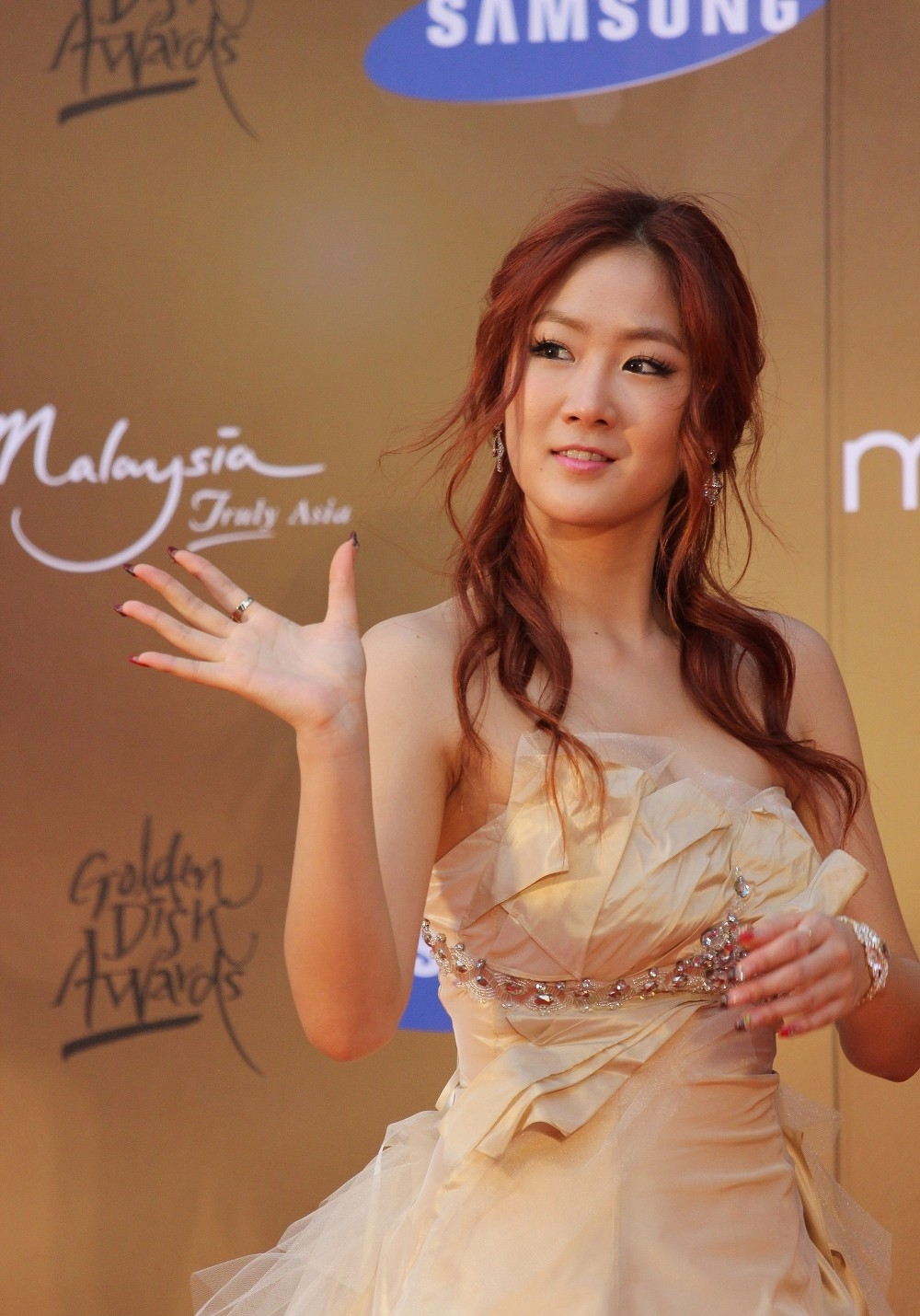
Soyou at the 27th Golden Disc Awards

In September 2013, it was revealed that Soyou and Mad Clown would release a duet called "Stupid in Love" on the 10th.

In February 2014, Soyou and Junggigo released a duet called "Some".

In January 2015, it was revealed that Soyou, together with Lee Hanee and Kim Jungmin, would be the new MCs of beauty tip program Get It Beauty. The new MCs' first episode aired on February 4, 2015.

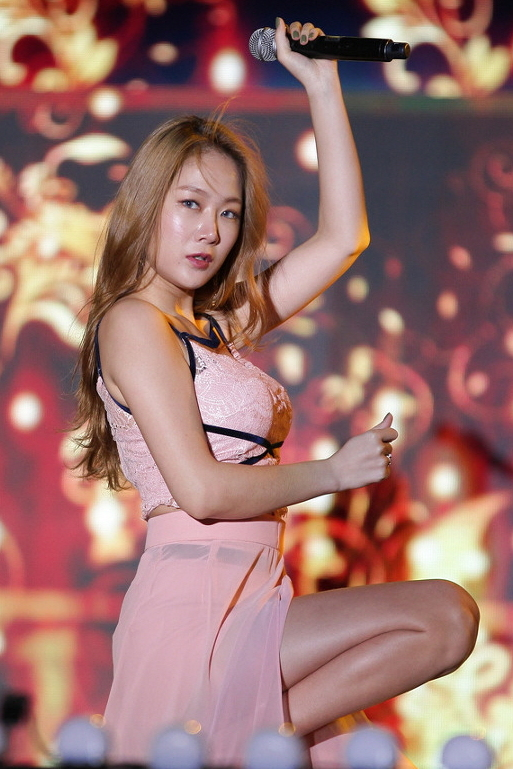
Soyou performing in 2016

In February 2017, Soyou and Baekhyun released a duet called "Rain".

In May 2017, Sistar released their last single "Lonely". The group performed their most successful summer hits – "Touch My Body", "Shake It", "Loving U", "I Swear" and also their last song "Lonely" on four major music shows, before concluding the schedule on Inkigayo on June 4, 2017 and officially disbanding.

In August 2017, Soyou was featured as the vocalist on Primary's song "Right?".

=== 2017–2023: Solo debut ===
After Sistar disbanded in June 2017, Soyou debuted her solo career under Starship Entertainment. She was featured on K.Will's fourth album Part.1 Nonfiction, for the B-side track titled "Let Me Hear You Say", released on September 26. She released a collaboration track titled "Monitor Girl" with Geeks' Louie on October 26, it was their second collaboration since "Officially Missing You, Too" in 2012. On November 16, Soyou released "I Still" with Sung Si-kyung as pre-release track for her upcoming solo album. On November 28, Soyou was confirmed to become an MC for a new beauty program of JTBC titled SoyouXHani's Beauty View, which began airing on December 28. On December 13, Soyou released the first part of her solo album titled Re:Born with the single "The Night" featuring rapper duo Geeks and produced by Primary.

A year and nine months after her last release, Soyou released "Gotta Go" on June 28, 2020. The song is a reggaeton, dance hall style song and was accompanied by a music video, released through Starship Entertainment's YouTube channel.

After eight months, Starship Entertainment announced that Soyou is gearing up for her next comeback on March 11, 2021. Soyou's new single "Good Night My Love" was reportedly written by Lee Hyori and composed by Babylon.

On September 8, Soyou decided not to renew her contract with Starship Entertainment. Later on September 29, Soyou signed with BPM Entertainment.

On March 1, 2022, BPM Entertainment announced Soyou would hold her first solo concert 'THE LIVE: NIGHT' on April 2 and 3. On April 27, Soyou released her third EP Day & Night, with the lead single "Business", featuring Be'O.

=== 2024–present: Business venture ===
On July 31, Soyou established the corporation So & You, wherein she was able to launch in November the whiskey-based "So Whiskey Highball" and the high-alcohol-based "So Goryangju Highball" in cans.

== Other ventures ==
=== Ambassadorship ===
In July 2014, Soyou became the promotional ambassador for the JTBC Seoul Marathon event, attended by 20,000 participants. Chosen by the event coordinator, Soyou's passion for running and commitment to self-care through exercise resonated with the event's theme, "Run As I Am."

In September 2018, Soyou became the public relations ambassador for the Seoul branch of the Korean Red Cross, appointed by its Chairman. She has been supporting the Seoul branch since 2015, aiding underprivileged groups like undernourished children, child-headed households, elderly individuals living alone, and multicultural families.

=== Endorsements ===
In September 2014, Soyou collaborated with the "비커즈 (bcuz)" brand, known for its "wrap jeans," a popular fashion item at the time. She continued her promotions with the brand, which had become a household name for its sportswear, by introducing and releasing new products for its 2015 S/S season. In June 2015, Soyou teamed up with Sung Si-kyung as endorsers for CJ CheilJedang's 'Bibigo Wanggyoja,' a side dish ideal for pairing with beer. The duo filmed TV commercials and advertisements together.

In July 2017, she was chosen as a model for GRN's health supplement products. She specifically endorsed well-known celebrity diet products such as Green Tea Catechins and Mister Red Power Up. In the following years, Soyou continued promoting the brand, later adding their anti-aging supplement products to her list of endorsements, before parting ways at the end of 2021. Later in 2017, Soyou, a singer born in Jeju, was selected by E'Mart as their endorser for their new liquor product called "Blue Night," which originated from Jeju. As part of the promotion, she released the single "Blue Nights of Jeju Island" alongside commercials and remained an active endorser until 2019.

In September 2018, she participated as an endorser in Lotte Rental's summer vacation season exhibition for their lifestyle platform "MYOMEE." The platform allows users to rent a variety of products and goods necessary for traveling through their app for a reasonable period of time.

In May 2020, the food corporation "Cookat" launched their new PB (Private Brand) products, 'Mukbang Tteokbokki Chicken Feet' and 'Grilled Chicken Tail Bones.' The launch is in collaboration with Soyou, who is one of the entertainment industry's leading 'chicken feet enthusiasts'. Soyou participated in the entire product development process such as recipe development, package design, and product capacity setting. In March 2021, Soyou, alongside Iz*One, was selected as Pepsi Zero Sugar's 2021 K-POP partners, releasing the single 'ZERO: ATTITUDE' as part of the 'Pepsi 2021 K-POP Campaign.'

Later in August 2021, Soyou, along with comedian Yoo Se-yoon, was selected as an endorser for the 'healthy active vacation' campaign by Frip, a tourism venture founded by the Korea Tourism Organization. In September 2023, Saint Satin selected Soyou as the brand's exclusive model for their Fret Acupressure Slippers, which can be worn all year round, and Fret's Indoor shoes that prevent noise between floors.

In March 2024, Soyou filmed commercials promoting the beverage 'Refreshingly Empty Barrel Light' (hereinafter referred to as Barrel Light) by Donghwa Pharmaceutical, a functional beverage product for constipation. In May, Soyou was selected by BlingU Co., Ltd. as the endorser of their "calf and shoulder massager" product, which was first introduced by the home appliance brand "Iyuz" and has been the top pick in the Korean Consumer Preferred Brands of small massagers. In October 2024, Soyou endorsed the "30-Second Quick Bubble Mask" product by the skincare brand "Menokin," a brand that has grown more than three times since its launch in 2023.

=== Philanthropy ===
In May 2017, Soyou donated ₩10 million won to the Korean Red Cross to support the underprivileged. On the same day, the organization revealed that she had been a part of the "Philanthropy and Culture Committee" of the Seoul branch since 2015, a group composed solely of high-value donors. In the following year, she was recognized as part of their 'Seoul Red Cross Pine Tree Club,' which is composed of individuals with cumulative donations totaling more than ₩30 million won.

In January 2018, Soyou held a flea market at Cure Coffee Bar with the theme "All About Soyou," where clothes, shoes, and items from her personal collection and sponsors were sold. All proceeds were then donated to the Green Umbrella Children's Foundation. In April 2019, she donated ₩10 million won through the Hope Bridge National Disaster Relief Association, requesting that it be used to aid residents affected by large-scale forest fires in Gangwon-do. In February 2020, Soyou donated ₩20 million won through Good Neighbors, an international relief and development NGO, to help prevent COVID-19 among Daegu residents.

In September 2022, Big Planet Made announced that Soyou donated ₩20 million won to the Hope Bridge National Disaster Relief Association by adding donations to the entire sales proceeds from the flea market she held under her name in Gangnam-gu, Seoul. Later in November, she donated a total of ₩20 million in scholarships to twenty underprivileged university students in Seoul through the Korean Red Cross Society for which Soyou acts as a public relations ambassador.

== Discography ==
=== Extended plays ===
Title	Details	Peak chart positions	Sales
Title	Details	KOR	Sales
Re:Born	Released: December 13, 2017; Label: Starship Entertainment; Formats: CD, digital download	19	KOR: 2,352
Re:Fresh	Released: October 4, 2018; Label: Starship Entertainment; Formats: CD, digital download	19	KOR: 1,870
Day & Night	Released: April 27, 2022; Label: BPM Entertainment; Formats: CD, digital download; Track listing: 1. "Business" (feat. Be'O); 2. "Heart" (마음) (feat. Jukjae); 3. "Some 2" (썸 2) (feat. Jung Yong-hwa); 4. "If I Had Known" (알았다면); 5. "Tree" (나무) (feat. DAVII)	90	Undisclosed
Summer Recipe	Released: July 26, 2023; Label: BPM Entertainment; Formats: CD, digital download; Track listing: 1. "Aloha" (feat. Bora); 2. "Starry Night" (feat. Mirani); 3. "Drivin' Me"; 4. "Bad Desire"; 5. "Soaked"	97	KOR: 897
Off Hours	Released: April 29, 2026; Label: Magic Strawberry Sound; Formats: CD, digital download; Track listing: 1. See Through; 2. Be Honest; 3. Girl; 4. Conversation; 5. Lonely Serenity		

=== Singles ===
List of singles, showing year released, with selected chart positions, and name of the album
Title	Year	Peak chart positions		Sales	Album
Title	Year	KOR	KOR Hot	Sales	Album
"The Night" (feat. Geeks) (Prod. By Primary)	2017	23	32	KOR: 103,392	Re:Born
"My Blossom"	2018	50	—	—	Non-album single
"All Night" (까만밤) (feat. Sik-K)	2018	59	—	—	Re:Fresh
"Gotta Go"	2020	157	98	—	Non-album singles
"Good Night My Love" (잘자요내사랑)	2021	— (Note: "Good Night My Love" did not enter the Circle Digital Chart, but peaked at number 33 on the Circle Download Chart.)	—	—	Non-album singles
"Business" (feat. Be'O)	2022	— (Note: "Business" did not enter the Circle Digital Chart, but peaked at number 50 on the Circle Download Chart.)	—	—	Day & Night
"Some 2" (feat. Jung Yong-hwa)	2022	— (Note: "Some 2" did not enter the Circle Digital Chart, but peaked at number 48 on the Circle Download Chart.)	—	—	Day & Night
"Farewell Everyday"(우리는 매일 이별을 향해 걸어가지)	2023	— (Note: "Farewell Everyday" did not enter the Circle Digital Chart, but peaked at number 45 on the Circle Download Chart.)	—	—	Non-album single
"Aloha" (feat. Bora)	2023	— (Note: "Aloha" did not enter the Circle Digital Chart, but peaked at number 27 on the Circle Download Chart.)	—	—	Summer Recipe
"Love, ing"(열애중)	2024	— (Note: "Love, ing" did not enter the Circle Digital Chart, but peaked at number 32 on the Circle Download Chart.)	—	—	Non-album single
"PDA"	2025	TBA		—	Non-album single
"See Through"	2026	—	—	—	Non-album single
"—" denotes releases that did not chart or were not released in that region. * Billboard Korea K-Pop Hot 100 was discontinued in April 2022.

=== As featured artist ===
List of features, showing year released, with selected chart positions, and name of the album
Title	Year	Peak chart positions		Sales	Album
Title	Year	KOR	US World	Sales	Album
"Simsim"(심심할때만) (Eluphant featuring Soyou)	2015	60	—	KOR: 51,626	Man on the Moon
"Right?" (Primary featuring Soyou)	2017	27	—	KOR: 105,072	Pop
"Let Me Hear You Say" (미필적 고의) (K.Will featuring Soyou)	2017	57	—	KOR: 192,272	Part.1 Nonfiction
"Forever Yours" (Key featuring Soyou)	2018	— (Note: "Forever Yours" did not enter the Gaon Digital Chart, but peaked at number 18 on the Gaon Download Chart.)	14	—	Face
"Walking" (걷는중) (DinDin featuring Soyou)	2020	— (Note: "Walking" did not enter the Circle Digital Chart, but peaked at number 72 on the Circle BGM Chart.)	—	—	Non-album single
"—" denotes releases that did not chart or were not released in that region.

=== Collaboration singles ===
List of collaboration singles, showing year released, with selected chart positions, and name of the album
Title	Year	Peak chart positions			Sales	Album
Title	Year	KOR	KOR Hot	US World	Sales	Album
"Officially Missing You, Too" (with Geeks)	2012	2	2	—	KOR: 2,971,434+	Re;code
"White Love" (하얀 설레임) (with K.Will & Boyfriend's Jeongmin)	2012	6	7	—	KOR: 818,220+	Starship Planet
"Goodbye" (with Hong Dae-kwang)	2013	10	8	—	KOR: 546,346+	Non-album singles
"Stupid in Love" (착해 빠졌어) (with Mad Clown)	2013	1	1	—	KOR: 1,991,920+	Non-album singles
"Some" (썸) (with Junggigo featuring Geeks' Lil Boi)	2014	1	1	19	KOR: 2,898,043+	Non-album singles
"The Space Between" (틈) (with Urban Zakapa's Kwon Sunil and Park Yongin	2014	2	—	—	KOR: 1,035,053+	Non-album singles
"Pillow" (팔베개) (with Giriboy featuring Kihyun)	2015	5	—	—	KOR: 768,684+	NO.MERCY Pt. 2
"Lean on Me" (어깨) (with 10cm's Kwon Jeongyeol)	2015	2	—	—	KOR: 1,307,880+	Non-album single
"Runnin'" (우리 둘) (with Henry)	2016	— (Note: "Runnin'" did not enter the Circle Digital Chart, but peaked at number 56 on the Circle Download Chart.)	—	—	KOR: 30,801+	SM Station Season 1
"Love Is One More Than Farewell" (사랑은 이별보다 하나가 많아) (with Junggigo)	2016	28	—	—	KOR: 67,070+	Inkigayo Music Crush Part.3
"Rain" (비가와) (with Baekhyun)	2017	2	—	—	KOR: 839,663	Non-album singles
"Perfect" (완벽해) (with Letter Flow)	2017	— (Note: "Perfect" did not enter the Circle Digital Chart, but peaked at number 91 on the Circle Download Chart.)	—	—	KOR: 16,816+	Non-album singles
"Monitory Girl" (with Geeks' Louie)	2017	—	—	—	—N/a	Non-album singles
"I Still" (with Sung Si-kyung)	2017	6	10	—	KOR: 389,115+	Part.1 RE:BORN
"Rain Drop" (비가 오잖아) (with OVAN)	2019	19	—	—	—N/a	Non-album single
"Beginning" (시작할까) with Rain)	2019	94	—	—	—N/a	The Love Of Autumn
"Bangkok" (with Francis)	2019	— (Note: "Bangkok" did not enter the Circle Digital Chart, but peaked at number 60 on the Circle BGM Chart.)	—	—	—N/a	Non-album single
"On the Road" (길에서) (with Jukjae)	2019	131	—	—	—N/a	X-Mas Project Vol. 1
"Don't Wake Me Up" (깨우지 마) (with MC Mong)	2022	71	—	—	—N/a	XbyX [꿈]
"Fine" (with Huh Gak)	2022	— (Note: "Fine" did not enter the Circle Digital Chart, but peaked at number 28 on the Circle Download Chart.)	—	—	—N/a	Non-album single
"Love Recipe" (with Junggigo)	2024	— (Note: "Love Recipe" did not enter the Circle Digital Chart, but peaked at number 55 on the Circle Download Chart.)	—	—	—N/a	WONDO Project: LOVE RECIPE, Vol.1
"—" denotes releases that did not chart or were not released in that region. * Billboard Korea K-Pop Hot 100 was discontinued in July 2014.

=== Soundtrack appearances ===
List of soundtrack appearances, showing year released, with selected chart positions, and name of the album
Title	Year	Peak chart positions			Sales	Album
Title	Year	KOR	KOR Hot	US World	Sales	Album
"It's Okay" (with Woo)	2010	—	—	—	—N/a	Gloria OST
"Should I Confess"	2010	39	—	—	—N/a	Playful Kiss OST
"Once More" (한번만)	2014	11	8	—	KOR: 492,400+	Empress Ki OST
"Diamond"	2014	— (Note: "Diamond" did not enter the Circle Digital Chart, but peaked at number 44 on the Circle Download Chart.)	—	—	KOR: 37,005+	The Snow Queen 2 OST
"You Don't Know Me" (모르나봐) (with Brother Su)	2015	4	—	—	KOR: 914,444+	She Was Pretty OST
"Tell Me" (내게 말해줘)	2016	41	—	—	KOR: 125,029+	Lucky Romance OST
"No Sleep" (잠은 다 잤나봐요) (with Yoo Seungwoo)	2016	5	—	—	KOR: 554,277 +	Love in the Moonlight OST
"I Miss You"	2016	5	—	11	KOR: 1,253,414+	Goblin OST
"First Love" (with Jeong Se-woon)	2018	— (Note: "First Love" did not enter the Gaon Digital Chart, but peaked at number 59 on the Gaon Download Chart.)	—	—	—N/a	Two Yoo Project Sugar Man OST
"Silence"	2018	— (Note: "Silence" did not enter the Gaon Digital Chart, but peaked at number 44 on the Gaon BGM Chart.)	—	—	—N/a	Life OST
"Shout Myself" (with Ha Hyun-woo)	2018	— (Note: "Shout Myself" did not enter the Gaon Digital Chart, but peaked at number 60 on the Gaon BGM Chart.)	—	—	—N/a	Road to Ithaca OST
"When It Rains" (비가 오면) (with Mad Clown)	2018	— (Note: "When It Rains" did not enter the Gaon Digital Chart, but peaked at number 20 on the Gaon BGM Chart.)	—	—	—N/a	The Third Charm OST
"Good to Be with You" (괜찮나요)	2019	— (Note: "Good to Be with You" did not enter the Gaon Digital Chart, but peaked at number 154 on the Gaon Download Chart.)	—	—	—N/a	When the Camellia Blooms OST
"Before Sunrise (Prod. Kiggen)"	2020	—	—	—	—N/a	Traveler – Argentina OST
"Goodbye" (이젠 안녕)	2020	— (Note: "Goodbye" did not enter the Circle Digital Chart, but peaked at number 17 on the Circle BGM Chart.)	—	—	—N/a	Oh My Baby OST
"The Only One" (하나면 돼요)	2020	— (Note: "The Only One" did not enter the Gaon Digital Chart, but peaked at number 192 on the Gaon Download Chart.)	—	—	—N/a	18 Again OST
"Puzzle" (with Park Woo-jin (AB6IX))	2021	— (Note: "Puzzle" did not enter the Gaon Digital Chart, but peaked at number 16 on the Gaon Download Chart.)	—	—	—N/a	Mr. Queen OST
"Don't Smile at Me" (웃어주지 말아요)	2021	— (Note: "Don't Smile at Me" did not enter the Gaon Digital Chart, but peaked at number 87 on the Gaon Download Chart.)	—	—	—N/a	Hello, Me! OST
"Breath"	2021	— (Note: "Breath" did not enter the Gaon Digital Chart, but peaked at number 77 on the Gaon Download Chart.)	—	—	—N/a	Morning Kiss at Tiffany's OST
"Paradise"	2021	—	—	—	—N/a	Idol: The Coup OST
"Only You"	2022	— (Note: "Only You" did not enter the Circle Digital Chart, but peaked at number 71 on the Circle Download Chart.)	—	—	—N/a	The Golden Spoon OST
"Good Bye"(이별언어)	2022	— (Note: "Good Bye" did not enter the Circle Digital Chart, but peaked at number 81 on the Circle Download Chart.)	—	—	—N/a	Love Is for Suckers OST
"Take Me Back in Time" (시간을 돌려서)	2023	— (Note: "Take Me Back in Time" did not enter the Circle Digital Chart, but peaked at number 92 on the Circle Download Chart.)	—	—	—N/a	Joseon Attorney OST
"—" denotes releases that did not chart or were not released in that region. * Billboard Korea K-Pop Hot 100 was discontinued in July 2014.

=== Promotional single ===
List of promotional singles, showing year released, with selected chart positions, and name of the album
Title	Year	Peak positions	Sales	Album
Title	Year	KOR	Sales	Album
"Blue Nights of Jeju Island"	2017	100	KOR: 19,977	Non-album singles
"Zero:Attitude" (with Iz*One feat. pH-1)	2021	119	—N/a	Non-album singles

=== Compilation appearances ===
List of compilation appearances, showing year released, with selected chart positions, and name of the album
Title	Year	Peak positions	Album
Title	Year	KOR Down.	Album
"I Knew I Would Fall In Love"	2021	107	Begin Again Open Mic Episode. 10
"Love Story" (with Kyu-hyun)	2022	164	Hidden Singer 7 Compilation
"Dolls"	2022	51	Star, Again Compilation
"An Obvious Break-Up" (with Lim Han-byeol, Kim Dong-ha, + 3 others)	2023	133	The Ultimate Karaoke Battle: VS Episode 1

=== Other charted songs ===
List of other charted songs, showing year released, with selected chart positions, and name of the album
Title	Year	Peak positions	Sales	Album
Title	Year	KOR Down.	Sales	Album
"Grown-up" (Prod. By 윤종신)	2017	98	KOR: 17,767	Part.1 RE:BORN
"Heart" (feat. Jukjae)	2022	134	—	Day & Night
"If I Had Known"	2022	192	—	Day & Night
"Starry Night" (feat. Mirani)	2023	140	—	Summer Recipe
"Drivin' Me"	2023	180	—	Summer Recipe
"Soaked"	2023	195	—	Summer Recipe
"Bad Desire"	2023	199	—	Summer Recipe

== Filmography ==
=== Television shows ===
Year	Title	Role	Notes	Ref.
2014	Wishing Star	Co-host		
2015	Get It Beauty	MC	Episodes 1–27, 31–32, 35, 37	
2016	Baek Jong-won's Top 3 Chef King	Regular member	Episodes 52–61	
2017	Law of the Jungle in New Zealand	Cast member	Episodes 270–273	
2017	Battle Trip	Trip planner	With Kim Da-som; episodes 42–45	
2018	Produce 48	Vocal trainer		
2019	Produce X 101	Special vocal trainer	Episodes 1–2	
2019	Matching Survival 1+1	Host	With Lee Soo-geun, Kim Hee-chul, P.O	
2019	The Call S2	Regular member	Episodes 1–10	
2020	Yacht Expedition: The Beginning	Regular member		
2021	Love Mafia	Host		
2022	Global Donation Show W (Double-U)	Special host		
2022	Youth Star	Youth mentor		
2022	Scance, not Hocance	Host		
2022	Hole-in-One	Host	with Kim Sung-joo	
2022	God Saeng Tour	Host		
2023	Super Karaoke Survival: VS	Producer	with Lim Han-byul	

=== Web shows ===
Year	Title	Role	Ref.
2022	Love Mafia	Host	
2022	Nostalgic Again	Host	

== Videography ==
=== Music videos ===
Title	Year	Director(s)	Ref.
"Officially Missing You, Too"	2012	Unknown	—N/a
"White Love"	2012	Yang Junghun	
"Stupid in Love"	2013	Digipedi	
"Some"	2014	Zanybros	—N/a
"The Space Between"	2014	Zanybros	—N/a
"Diamond"	2014	BSPictures	—N/a
"Lean on Me"	2015	BSPictures	—N/a
"Runnin'"	2016	Tiger Cave	
"Rain"	2017	Mustache Film	
"The Blue Night of Jeju Island"	2017	Unknown	—N/a
"I Still"	2017	BTS Film	
"The Night"	2017	Lumpens	
"Grown Up"	2018	Unknown	—N/a
"All Night"	2018	Tiger Cave	—N/a
"Bangkok"	2019	Unknown	—N/a
"Gotta Go"	2020	HQF	
"Business" (feat. Be'O)	2022	Aeri Lee (wonderwall31)	

== Concert and tours ==
=== Solo concert ===
Title	Date	Venue	Ref
The Live: Night	April 2, 2022	Sogang University Mary Hall	
The Live: Night	April 3, 2022	Sogang University Mary Hall	

=== Concert participation ===
Title	Date	Venue	City	Country	Ref
Starship X Concert	December 5, 2014	Walker Hill Theater	Seoul	South Korea	
2022 BNF Festival	June 4, 2022	Lake 88 Waterside Park	Seoul	South Korea	
2022 BNF Festival	June 5, 2022	Lake 88 Waterside Park	Seoul	South Korea	
K-Concert : Vocalist Live in Japan	February 18, 2023	Toyosu PIT	Tokyo	Japan	

=== Affiliated concert ===
Year	Title	Note
2017	Junggigo Live Concert < 2017 >	Guest
2018	K.Will National Tour Concert <THE K.WILL>	Guest
2021	MC Mong Concert〈MC Mong 20th Anniversary Concert: It begins now! 〉	Guest
2021	Wonho Concert〈'WE ARE YOUNG'〉	Guest
2022	MC Mong Concert 〈Monster Co., Ltd. - 2nd Annual General Meeting of Shareholders: Halloween Workshop〉	Guest
2022	Lee Mu-jin National Tour Concert〈Supplementary Book〉	Guest

== Awards and nominations ==
Name of the award ceremony, year presented, category, nominee of the award, and the result of the nomination
Award ceremony	Year	Category	Nominee / Work	Result	Ref.
Gaon Chart Music Awards	2013	Artist of the Year – September	"Stupid in Love" (with Mad Clown)	Won	
Gaon Chart Music Awards	2014	Long-Run Song of the Year	"Some" (with Junggigo)	Won	
Gaon Chart Music Awards	2014	Song of the Year – February	"Some" (with Junggigo)	Won	
Golden Disc Awards	2015	Digital Bonsang	"Some" (with Junggigo)	Won	
Golden Disc Awards	2015	Trend of the Year	"Some" (with Junggigo)	Won	
KBS Music Awards	2014	Grand Prize (Daesang)	"Some" (with Junggigo)	Won	
Korea Drama Awards	2016	Best Original Soundtrack	"Tell Me"	Nominated	
Korea Drama Awards	2017	Best Original Soundtrack	"I Miss You"	Nominated	
Korea First Brand Awards (Note: The Korea First Brand Awards is hosted by the Korea Consumer Brand Committee and the Korea Consumer Forum. Awards are based on a nationwide survey held in South Korea.)	2019	Best Female Solo Singer	Soyou	Won	
Korea First Brand Awards	2019	Best Female Entertainer	Soyou	Nominated	
Korean Music Awards	2015	Best Pop Song	"Some" (with Junggigo)	Won	
Korean Music Awards	2015	Song of the Year (Daesang)	"Some" (with Junggigo)	Won	
Korean Music Awards	2015	Group Musician of the Year	Soyou (with Junggigo)	Nominated	
Melon Music Awards	2014	Hot Trend Award	"Some" (with Junggigo)	Won	
Melon Music Awards	2014	Best R&B/Soul Award	"Some" (with Junggigo)	Nominated	
Melon Music Awards	2014	Song of the Year	"Some" (with Junggigo)	Nominated	
Melon Music Awards	2017	Top 10 Artist	Soyou	Nominated	
Melon Music Awards	2018	Hot Trend Award	"I Still" (with Sung Si-kyung)	Nominated	
Mnet Asian Music Awards	2014	Best Collaboration	"Some" (with Junggigo)	Won	
Mnet Asian Music Awards	2014	UnionPay Song of the Year	"Some" (with Junggigo)	Longlisted	
Mnet Asian Music Awards	2015	Best Collaboration	"Lean on Me" (with Kwon Jeong-yeol)	Nominated	
Mnet Asian Music Awards	2015	UnionPay Song of the Year	"Lean on Me" (with Kwon Jeong-yeol)	Longlisted	
Mnet Asian Music Awards	2017	Best Collaboration	Rain (with Baekhyun)	Nominated	
Mnet Asian Music Awards	2017	Song of the Year	Rain (with Baekhyun)	Longlisted	
Mnet Asian Music Awards	2019	Best Collaboration	"Rain Drop" (with Ovan)	Nominated	
SBS Gayo Daejun	2014	Best Song (Daesang)	"Some" (with Junggigo)	Won	
Seoul International Drama Awards	2014	Outstanding Korean Drama OST	"Once More"	Nominated	
Seoul International Youth Film Festival	2014	Best OST by a Female Artist	"Once More"	Nominated	
Seoul Music Awards	2015	Best Song Award	"Some" (with Junggigo)	Won	
Soribada Best K-Music Awards	2018	Bonsang Award	Soyou	Nominated	
Style Icon Awards	2014	Top 10 Style Icons of the Year	Soyou	Won	

=== Listicles ===
Publisher	Year	Category	Placement	Ref.
GQ Korea	2014	Woman of the Year	Placed	
