= Rain (Soyou and Baekhyun song) =

Single by Soyou and Baekhyun
- Released: February 14, 2017
- Recorded: 2017
- Genre: K-pop
- Length: 3:46
- Label: Starship; LOEN
- Songwriter: Phat Music
- Producers: Phat Music, Score

Soyou singles chronology
"Runnin'" (2016)	"Rain" (2017)	"Perfect" (2017)

Baekhyun singles chronology
"The Day" (2016)	"Rain" (2017)	"Take You Home" (2017)

Music video
- "Rain" on YouTube

"Rain" (Korean: 비가와) is a song by South Korean singers Soyou and Baekhyun, members of K-pop groups Sistar and EXO, respectively. It was released on February 14, 2017, by Starship Entertainment.

== Background and release ==
On February 6, 2017, Soyou and Baekhyun were announced by Starship Entertainment to be collaborating on a duet titled "Rain". The song reflects the melancholic feelings of nostalgia that accompanies the rain after a relationship comes to an end. On February 9, a teaser video of the two singers recording the song was released. On February 14, the song was released digitally accompanied by its music video. On February 15, Starship Entertainment released a behind-the-scenes video of the song's recording session.

== Music video ==
The music video features a high school student (starred An Yu-jin, member of IVE) reminiscing on a rainy day by herself while listening to music. It hit 1 million views in less than a day from its release. On February 15, Starship Entertainment released a special clip of the music video starring Soyou.

== Reception ==
Upon release, "Rain" quickly reached the top on every South Korean online music charts, an achievement known as "all-kill". The song debuted at number two on the South Korean Gaon Digital Chart. The song placed first on QQ Music's K-pop chart as well as on YinYueTai's weekly music video chart.

== Charts ==
Chart (2017)	Peak position
South Korea (Circle)	2

== Sales ==
Region	Sales
South Korea (Gaon)	839,663

== Awards and nominations ==
Year	Award	Category	Result
2017	19th Mnet Asian Music Awards	Best Collaboration	Nominated
2017	19th Mnet Asian Music Awards	Qoo10 Song of the Year	Nominated

== Release history ==
Region	Date	Format	Label
Various	February 13, 2017	Digital download; streaming	Starship; LOEN
South Korea	February 14, 2017	Digital download; streaming	Starship; LOEN
