= The Day (K.Will and Baekhyun song) =

Single by K.Will and Baekhyun

from the album SM Station Season 1
- Released: May 13, 2016
- Studio: InGrid (Seoul); Seoul; SM Blue Cup (Seoul); SM Blue Ocean (Seoul); Sound (Seoul)
- Genre: Ballad
- Length: 3:50
- Label: SM; KT
- Songwriters: Miss Kay, Kim Jae-hyung
- Producers: Miss Kay, Kim Jae-hyung

K.Will singles chronology
"Cook For Love" (2016)	"The Day" (2016)	"That's What" (2016)

Baekhyun singles chronology
"Dream" (2016)	"The Day" (2016)	"Rain" (2017)

Music video
- "The Day" on YouTube

"The Day" is a single by South Korean singers K.Will and Baekhyun, member of South Korean boy group EXO. The song was released by SM Entertainment on May 13, 2016, through SM Station.

== Background and release ==
On May 9, 2016, SM shared a teaser photo with images of Baekhyun only for the collaboration. On May 10, it was revealed via a teaser image that the artist that will collaborate with Baekhyun would be K.Will.

Produced by Miss Kay and Kim Jae-hyung, "The Day" is described as a ballad song combined with acoustic guitar about yearning for a lost love.

== Music video ==
The music video for "The Day" was released on May 13, 2016. In it, a man is seen being confronted with happy memories from the past while regretting his decisions. Although Baekhyun and K.Will do not take lead roles in the music video, they are seen singing emotionally against a black backdrop throughout the video.

== Track listing ==
No.	Title	Lyrics	Music	Arrangement	Length
1.	"The Day"	Miss Kay; Kim Jae-hyung	Miss Kay; Kim Jae-hyung	Miss Kay; Kim Jae-hyung	03:50
2.	"The Day" (Inst.)		Miss Kay; Kim Jae-hyung	Miss Kay; Kim Jae-hyung	03:50
Total length:					07:40

== Charts ==
=== Weekly charts ===
Chart (2016)	Peak position
South Korea (Circle)	8
US World Digital Songs (Billboard)	21

=== Monthly charts ===
Chart (2016)	Peak position
South Korean Monthly singles (Gaon)	32

== Sales ==
Region	Sales
South Korea (Gaon)	251,025

== Release history ==
Region	Date	Format	Label
Various	May 12, 2016	Digital download; streaming	SM; KT
South Korea	May 13, 2016	Digital download; streaming	SM; KT
