= Young (Baekhyun and Loco song) =

2018 single by Baekhyun and Loco

Single by Baekhyun and Loco
- Released: August 31, 2018
- Recorded: 2018
- Studio: Doobdoob (Seoul); InGrid (Seoul)
- Genre: Electropop
- Length: 3:50
- Label: SM; Dreamus
- Composers: Ludvig Evers; Golden; Loco; Jonatan Gusmark
- Lyricists: JQ; TOMBOY; Loco

Baekhyun singles chronology
"Take You Home" (2017)	"Young" (2018)	"UN Village" (2019)

Loco singles chronology
"Upside Down" (2018)	"Young" (2018)	"Love" (2021)

Music video
- "Young" on YouTube

"Young" is a single by South Korean singer Baekhyun and rapper Loco. The song was released on August 31, 2018, by SM Entertainment through STATION X 0.

== Background and release ==
On July 23, it was revealed that Baekhyun will collaborate with Loco. On August 21, it was confirmed that the single is titled "Young" and will be released on August 31 through SM Station X 0.

"Young" was described as an electro pop track with a heavy beat and an addictive melody. The lyrics are about the strong aspirations of a younger generation who refuses to live the exact same way as others.

== Critical reception ==
"Young" received generally favorable reviews from music critics. Tamar Herman from Billboard wrote that the "song revels in the vocalist's expressive tone and Loco's rhythmic style as it critiques societal norms, such as education, that make "Young" people turn away from their own distinct paths". Taylor Amani from MACG Magazine states that the "music video and lyrics mirror the irregular composition. Wanting to be unique and fighting rigid standards holds true throughout".

== Commercial performance ==
Upon release, "Young" quickly reached the top spots on South Korean music charts including Melon, Genie, Bugs, Soribada, and Olleh Music. The song debuted as number eleven on Korea's Gaon Digital Chart, and number four on Billboard's US World Digital Songs.

== Charts ==
=== Weekly ===
Chart (2018)	Peak position
South Korea (Gaon)	11
South Korea (K-pop Hot 100)	18
US World Digital Songs (Billboard)	4

=== Monthly ===
Chart (2018)	Peak position
South Korea (Gaon)	22

== Awards and nominations ==
Year	Award	Category	Result
2018	10th Melon Music Awards	Hot Trend Award	Nominated

== Release history ==
Region	Date	Format	Label
South Korea	August 31, 2018	Digital download; streaming	SM; Dreamus
Various	August 31, 2018	Digital download; streaming	SM
