= I Need You (K.Will EP) =

EP by K.Will
- Released: February 14, 2012
- Genre: K-pop
- Label: LOEN Entertainment
- Producer: Starship Entertainment

K.Will chronology
My Heart Beating (2011)	I Need You (2012)	The Third Album (2012)

Singles from I Need You
- 1. "I Hate Myself" Released: January 30, 2012; 2. "I Need You" Released: February 14, 2012

I Need You is the third mini-album released by South Korean balladeer K.Will. It was released in Korea on February 14, 2012.

== Track listing ==
CD
No.	Title	Length
1.	"Calling You"	3:41
2.	"I Need You"	3:37
3.	"I Hate Myself"	3:53
4.	"Nothing Left"	4:30
5.	"I'm Will"	3:38
6.	"I'll Be With You"	4:39
7.	"I Need You (Instrumental)"	3:36
