= Hello, World (EP) =

- Digital cover

EP by Baekhyun
- Released: September 6, 2024
- Studio: InGrid (Seoul)
- Genre: R&B
- Length: 18:46
- Language: Korean
- Label: INB100; Dreamus

Baekhyun chronology
Bambi (2021)	Hello, World (2024)	Essence of Reverie (2025)

Singles from Hello, World
- 1. "Pineapple Slice" Released: September 6, 2024

Hello, World is the fourth Korean-language extended play and fifth overall by South Korean singer Baekhyun. It was released on September 6, 2024, by INB100 through Dreamus and contains six tracks, including the lead single "Pineapple Slice".

== Background ==
On July 27, 2024, Baekhyun revealed one of his unreleased song, a bossa nova-inspired "Rendez-Vous" in between of his performances of his encore concert tour Lonsdaleite Tour [dot]. After the concert stage was over on July 28, a video was released where Baekhyun eating a can of pineapple along with a phrase using a famous line from the movie Chungking Express and at the end of the video, the date '2024. 09' appeared, hinting a comeback in September.

On August 12, 2024, INB100 announced that Baekhyun would make a comeback by releasing his fourth EP titled Hello, World on September 6, 2024, about 3 years and 5 months since the released of Bambi and his first work after establishing his own company. The next day, pre-order of the EP began at various online and offline music stores and it has four versions: Pineapple, Photobook Hello, Photobook World, and Folder. INB100 released the scheduler of Baekhyun's fourth EP and revealed various teasing contents on August 14.

The music video teasers of the lead single "Pineapple Slice" were released on September 2 and 5, 2024, respectively.

== Release and promotion ==
"The symbolic meaning behind Hello, World is that, now that I've said hello, I'm going to keep being active. There will no longer be any big breaks. I will show many more sides of myself from now on."

— Baekhyun, in Dazed Interview

Hello, World was released worldwide on September 6, 2024, by INB100 and Dreamus. On the same day, Baekhyun performed his first music show stage on KBS' Music Bank.

== Commercial performance ==
According to Hanteo Chart, Hello, World recorded a 890,000+ copies sold on the first day of its release, setting a new record from his previous releases.

== Track listing ==
Hello, World track listing
No.	Title	Lyrics	Music	Arrangement	Length
1.	"Good Morning"	Colde	Colde; Basecamp	Colde; Basecamp	3:23
2.	"Pineapple Slice"	Park Tae-won; Shakka Philip	Eljay; Shakka; Forever Noh; TMM; Dom Rivinius	Eljay; Rivinius	3:15
3.	"Rendez-Vous"	Colde	Royal Dive; Junny	Royal Dive	3:32
4.	"Cold Heart"	Park	Robert Ziff Resnick; Nathan DiRocco	Rez	2:31
5.	"Woo"	Dut2; Ron; Jane	Dut2; Dress; Ahn Da-young	Dress	3:12
6.	"Truth Be Told"	Kang Eun-jeong	Super Miles; Tk Kayembe; Josef Lamercier; Devin Tracy; TMM	Miles; Kayembe	2:53
Total length:					18:46

== Charts ==
=== Weekly charts ===
Weekly chart performance for Hello, World
Chart (2024)	Peak position
Japanese Albums (Oricon)	28
Japanese Digital Albums (Oricon)	17
Japanese Hot Albums (Billboard Japan)	46
South Korean Albums (Circle)	1
UK Album Downloads (OCC)	86

=== Monthly charts ===
Monthly chart performance for Hello, World
Chart (2024)	Peak position
South Korean Albums (Circle)	1

=== Year-end charts ===
Year-end chart performance for Hello, World
Chart (2024)	Position
South Korean Albums (Circle)	14

== Certifications ==
Certifications for Hello, World
Region	Certification	Certified units/sales
South Korea (KMCA)	Million	1,000,000^{^}
^{^} Shipments figures based on certification alone.

== Release history ==
Release history for Hello, World
Region	Date	Format	Label
South Korea	September 6, 2024	CD	INB100; Dreamus
Various	September 6, 2024	Digital download; streaming	INB100; Dreamus
