= K.Will =

South Korean singer

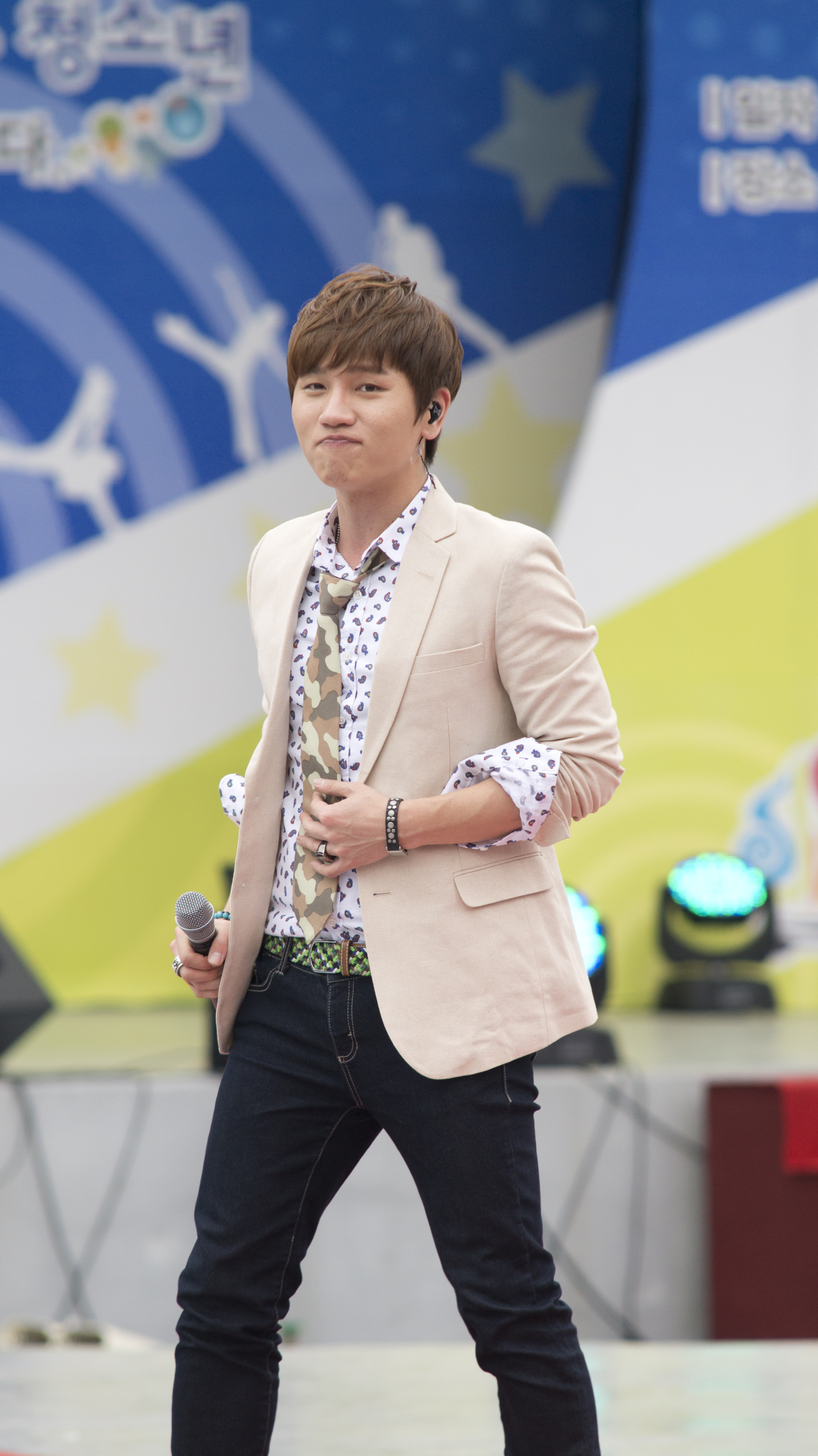
- K.Will in 2013

Background information
- Born: Kim Hyung-soo; December 30, 1981 (age 44); Seoul, South Korea
- Genres: K-pop; ballad; R&B
- Occupation: Singer
- Years active: 2007–present
- Labels: Big Hit; Starship
- Website: Official website

Korean name
- Hangul: 김형수
- RR: Gim Hyeongsu
- MR: Kim Hyŏngsu

Kim Hyung-soo (Korean: 김형수; born December 30, 1981), better known by his stage name K.Will (Korean: 케이윌), is a South Korean singer. The name is a combination of the first letter 'K' of his last name 'Kim' and the English word 'Will'. He debuted in 2007 and has since become known for his chart-topping ballads. He has also been dubbed the "Prince of OST" for his frequent Korean drama soundtrack appearances.

K.Will has released four full-length albums: Left Heart (2007), Missing You (2009), The Third Album (2012–2013), and The Fourth Album (2017–2018).

== Career ==
=== 2003–2008: Career beginnings and breakthrough with Left Heart ===
Prior to his debut, K.Will trained to be a singer for five years under producer Bang Si-hyuk. He also worked as a "guide vocal," singing demos of songs that would ultimately be recorded by other artists including TVXQ, g.o.d. and Rain. During this time, he was dubbed the "male Mariah Carey," after a video of him singing Carey's songs became popular on South Korean websites.

K.Will released his debut album, Left Heart (왼쪽 가슴), on March 6, 2007 via Bang's label Big Hit Entertainment. Producer Park Jin-young composed the album's title song, which reached number 3 on the Melon digital chart shortly after its release.

In January 2008, K.Will left Big Hit and joined his agent Kim Shi-dae's new company Starship Entertainment. On December 2, 2008, he released the digital single "Love 119", featuring rapper MC Mong. The single reached number 1 on various online music charts.

=== 2009–2011: Missing You, first "all-kill" and Immortal Songs ===
K.Will released his first extended play, Dropping the Tears (눈물이 뚝뚝), featuring a title track of the same name, on March 31, 2009. The song topped online music charts the day after its release. On November 5, he released his second album, Missing You (그립고 그립고 그립다). The album's title song was a success on South Korean charts. K.Will held his first solo concert, a sold-out performance at Yonsei University in Seoul, on December 25.

On March 10, 2010, K.Will released the single "Present" (선물), featuring Eun Ji-won. The song was an instant success, topping real-time online music charts following its release. That May, K.Will held a sold-out solo concert in Tokyo, followed by a concert in Osaka in July. In December, he also sold out two solo concerts in Seoul.

On January 21, 2011, K.Will released the single "Amazed" (기가 차), featuring rapper Simon D and Hyolyn of girl group Sistar. The song rapidly reached the top of several music charts. On March 10, K.Will released his second mini album, My Heart Beating (가슴이 뛴다), featuring the lead single of the same name. The single was an "all-kill", topping all major South Korean real-time music charts simultaneously. It was K.Will's first number 1 single on the weekly Gaon Digital Chart. The single also marked the first time K.Will won first place on a South Korean music chart television show, with his April 3 win on Inkigayo.

K.Will held his third solo concert in Seoul on June 25, 2011, featuring guests Wheesung, Lee Hyun and Sistar. He held his annual Christmas concert over three days in December, featuring special guests Wonder Girls and Orange Caramel. He also finished out the year as a contestant on the TV show Immortal Songs 2, which he left in January 2012 after setting a record of five consecutive wins in the singing competition.

=== 2012–2016: The 3rd Album and continued chart-topping success ===
On February 14, 2012, K.Will released his third mini album, I Need You (니가 필요해). The title song of the same name peaked at number 1 on the Gaon Digital Chart, while the album's pre-release single, "I Hate Myself" (내가 싫다), reached number 2. On October 11, K.Will released The 3rd Album, Part 1, including the title track "Please Don't..." (이러지마 제발). The song was an instant success on South Korean music charts. The music video, starring Ahn Jae-hyun, Seo In-guk, and Dasom, received both domestic and international attention for its twist ending featuring a same-sex crush.

On April 4, 2013, K.Will released The 3rd Album, Part 2, with the lead single "Love Blossom." The song was another hit, debuting at number 2 on the Gaon Digital Chart. K.Will released his fourth mini album, Will in Fall, on October 18. The lead single, "You Don't Know Love" (촌스럽게 왜 이래), was his third number 1 hit on the Gaon Digital Chart.

On June 25, 2014, K.Will released his fifth mini album, One Fine Day, featuring the lead single "Day 1" (오늘부터 1일), which peaked at number 2 on the Gaon Digital Chart. He released his fifth mini album, [Re:] and its lead single "Growing" (꽃이 핀다), on March 25, 2015. The song was an instant hit in South Korea, and also performed well on Chinese digital charts.

In 2016, K.Will again topped the charts. His digital single "You Call It Romance" (니가 하면 로맨스), featuring Davichi, ranked number 2 on the Gaon Digital Chart following its January release. That March, his song "Talk Love" (말해! 뭐해?), from the soundtrack to the television series Descendants of the Sun, reached number 1 on the chart.

=== 2017–present: The 4th Album ===
K.Will released The 4th Album Part 1 [Nonfiction] on September 26, 2017, along with an accompanying music video for the title track "Nonfiction" (실화). On October 28, 2018, K.Will revealed the tracklist for The 4th Album Part.2 [想像; Mood Indigo], and an album teaser was released three days later. The album was released on November 6, with K.Will co-producing each song.

In February 2020, K.Will renewed his contract with Starship Entertainment.

On August 12, 2022, it was announced that K.Will will begin the nationwide Here and Now tour, to be held in October.

== Discography ==
- Left Heart (2007)
- Missing You (2009)
- The 3rd Album (2012–2013)
- The 4th Album (2017–2018)

== Tours ==
- I Need You (March–April 2012)
- K Daebak Tour (February 2014)
- Bromance Show (with Wheesung) (May 2019)
- 2018-19 Concert Tour: The K.Will (December 2018–February 2019)
- 2019-20 Concert Tour: The K.Will (December 2019–March 2020)
- Here and Now (October–December 2022)

== Filmography ==
=== Television dramas ===
Year	Title	Role	Notes	Ref.
2009	Soul Special	Park Ju-ho	Web series	
2011	Spy Myung-wol	Himself	Cameo in episode 10	
2015	Hyde Jekyll, Me	Himself	Cameo in episode 18	
2015	The Producers	Himself	Cameo in episode 9	

=== Reality television ===
Year	Title	Notes	Ref.
2011–2012	Immortal Songs 2	Contestant	
2014–2015	Real Men	Cast member	
2016	Vocal War: God's Voice	Contestant	
2017	King of Mask Singer	Contestant as "Cute Baby Seahorse"	
2019	Super Hearer	Hearer	
2021	Tomorrow's National Singer	Judge	

== Musical productions ==
Title	Years	Role	Location	Notes
Hell's Kitchen	2026	Davis	GS Art Center (Gangnam District, Seoul)	Written by Kristoffer Diaz, Directed by Michael Greif, Music by Alicia Keys

== Awards and nominations ==
Award ceremony	Year	Category	Nominee / Work	Result	Ref.
Cyworld Digital Music Awards	2011	Song of the Month - March	"My Heart Beating"	Won	
Daegu International Musical Festival Awards	2017	Best New Performer	K.Will (for Notre-Dame de Paris)	Won	
Gaon Chart Music Awards	2012	Artist of the Year in Digital Music - February	K.Will	Won	
Golden Disc Awards	2007	Rookie Artist of the Year	K.Will	Nominated	
Golden Disc Awards	2009	Digital Bonsang	"Dropping the Tears"	Nominated	
Golden Disc Awards	2010	Album Bonsang	Missing You	Nominated	
Golden Disc Awards	2012	Digital Bonsang	"My Heart Beating"	Won	
Golden Disc Awards	2012	Song of the Year	"My Heart Beating"	Nominated	
Golden Disc Awards	2013	Digital Bonsang	"I Need You"	Won	
Golden Disc Awards	2013	Song of the Year	"I Need You"	Nominated	
Golden Disc Awards	2014	Digital Bonsang	"Love Blossom"	Nominated	
Golden Disc Awards	2015	Digital Bonsang	"Day 1"	Won	
Golden Disc Awards	2015	Song of the Year	"Day 1"	Nominated	
Korea Entertainment Arts Awards	2010	Male Ballad Singer Award	K.Will	Won	
Korean Video Festival	2009	Photogenic Award	K.Will	Won	
MAMA Awards	2007	Best New Artist	"Left Heart"	Nominated	
MAMA Awards	2010	Best Vocal Performance - Solo	"Missing You"	Nominated	
MAMA Awards	2011	Best Vocal Performance - Solo	"My Heart Beating"	Nominated	
MAMA Awards	2012	Best Vocal Performance - Solo	"I Need You"	Won	
MAMA Awards	2012	Best Male Artist	K.Will	Nominated	
MAMA Awards	2013	Best Vocal Performance - Male	"Love Blossom"	Nominated	
MAMA Awards	2014	Best Vocal Performance - Male	"Day 1"	Nominated	
Melon Music Awards	2009	Top 10 Artist (Bonsang)	K.Will	Won	
Melon Music Awards	2012	Best R&B/Ballad Award	"Please Don't"	Won	
Melon Music Awards	2013	Best R&B/Ballad Award	"You Don't Know Love"	Won	
Seoul Music Awards	2012	R&B Ballad Award	K.Will	Won	
Seoul Music Awards	2013	R&B Ballad Award	K.Will	Won	
Seoul Music Awards	2014	R&B Ballad Award	K.Will	Won	
TV Writers Association	2007	Top Rookie Singer Award	K.Will	Won	
