= LeeMujin Service =

Web television series

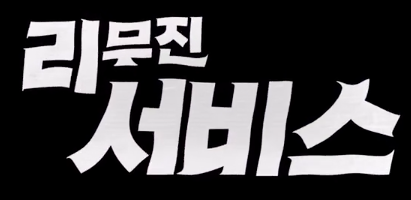
- Hangul: 리무진 서비스
- Lit.: Limousine/Lee Mujin Service
- RR: Rimujin seobiseu
- MR: Rimujin sŏbisŭ
- Genre: Music; Interview
- Directed by: Choi Seung-yeon
- Presented by: Lee Mu-jin
- Composers: Park Da-eun; Choi In-young; Kang Ga-in; Shim Pyeong-on; Lim Joo-ae
- Country of origin: South Korea
- Original language: Korean
- No. of seasons: 1
- No. of episodes: 243

Production
- Executive producer: Park Min-jung
- Producers: Lee Dong-hoon; Park Jin-woo; Oh Yoon-jin; Kim Jin-eui
- Camera setup: Multi-camera
- Running time: 25 – 40 minutes
- Production company: Studio K

Original release
- Network: YouTube; KBS2
- Release: 22 February 2022 – present

LeeMujin Service (Korean: 리무진 서비스; RR: Rimujin seobiseu) is a South Korean talk show and live music web television program hosted by South Korean singer-songwriter Lee Mu-jin. First airing on 22 February 2022, the program is released first every Tuesday at 6 pm KST on the YouTube channel KBS Kpop, and airs on KBS2 every Wednesday at 11 pm KST.

The program features live music performances from individual idol group members and solo acts, without an audience. The name of the show is a pun on the phrase "limousine service"; the Korean pronunciation of "limousine" sounds identical to the American pronunciation of the host's name "Lee Mu-jin."

== Format ==
The format involves a guest opening the show with the most recent song released by the guest's group (or their own song if the guest is a solo artist). The show then proceeds with the guest singing two songs (called "live services") and is followed by a duet song with Lee. The set list for each show is planned in advance. The only instrumental accompaniment in the show is from a keyboardist. In addition to the two "live services" and the duet, Lee asks the guest about their music career and also asks the guest to sing fragments of other songs (like their audition song, a song from a different genre, a song from a senior singer they admire, and so on).

== Development ==
This show marks Lee Mu-jin's debut as an MC.

== Accompaniment ==
- The show usually has one keyboardist on-site providing accompaniment for each song and only their hands are shown. So far, four keyboardists have appeared: Jung Dae-hoon (Ep. 1–79), Kim Hae-seung (Ep. 80–142, 145–213, 215-present), Choi Su-ji (143–144), and Lee Byung-do (214). Additionally, one guitarist, Yoon Gap-yeol (214), provided special accompaniment for this episode.

== Overview ==
Season	Episode	Originally Aired		Time Slot (KST)	
Season	Episode	First aired	Last aired	Premiered	Re-run
1	1 – 42	22 February 2022	13 December 2022	Tuesday at 6 pm	Wednesday at 12 pm
1	TBA	20 December 2022	TBA	Tuesday at 6 pm	Tuesday at 11 pm
Special Episodes	–	27 June 2022		Tuesday at 6 pm	Tuesday at 11 pm
Special Episodes	43	27 December 2022		Tuesday at 6 pm	Tuesday at 11 pm
Special Episodes	56	1 April 2023		Tuesday at 6 pm	Tuesday at 11 pm
Special Episodes	62	9 May 2023		Tuesday at 6 pm	Tuesday at 11 pm
Special Episodes	100	6 February 2024		Tuesday at 6 pm	Tuesday at 11 pm
Special Episodes	141	19 November 2024		Tuesday at 6 pm	Tuesday at 11 pm
Special Episodes	146 (part 1)	31 December 2024		Tuesday at 6 pm	Tuesday at 11 pm
Special Episodes	146 (part 2)	1 January 2025		Wednesday at 6 pm	Wednesday at 11 pm
Special Episodes	178	26 August 2025		Tuesday at 6 pm	Tuesday at 11 pm
Special Episodes	234	22 September 2026		Tuesday at 6 pm	Tuesday at 11 pm

== Guests ==
This is a list of groups with multiple appearances on this show and their respective episode numbers. Names in italic bold means the member is no longer part of the group, but he/she was at the time the episode aired.

Group	Singer (Episode)
aespa	Winter (72)
aespa	Ningning (116)
aespa	Karina (137)
Alpha Drive One	Leo (216)
Alpha Drive One	Anxin (231)
Ateez	Jongho (24)
Ateez	Hongjoong (68)
Ateez	San (139)
Ateez	Seonghwa (169)
Ateez	Yunho (200)
Ateez	Wooyoung (221)
AtHeart	Bome & Seohyeon (205)
Babymonster	Rami (125)
Babymonster	Ahyeon (140)
Babymonster	Chiquita (189)
BoyNextDoor	Taesan (110)
BoyNextDoor	Riwoo (131)
BoyNextDoor	Sungho (164)
BoyNextDoor	Woonhak (187)
BoyNextDoor	Leehan (219)
BTS	Jimin (56)
BTS	Jin (141)
Cortis	Martin (195)
Cortis	Keonho (213)
Cravity	Jungmo and Woobin (171)
Davichi	Lee Hae-ri and Kang Min-kyung (185)
Enhypen	**Heeseung (16, 222)**
Enhypen	Jake (198)
Exo	Suho (7)
Exo	D.O. (81)
Exo	Baekhyun (165)
Exo	Chen (184)
Fromis 9	Song Ha-young and Park Ji-won (19)
Fromis 9	**Lee Seo-yeon (67)**
Fromis 9	Lee Chae-young (225)
Girls' Generation	Taeyeon (145)
Girls' Generation	Tiffany Young (214)
Got7	Jay B and Choi Young-jae (150)
Got7	Park Jin-young (217)
Highlight	Son Dong-woon (18)
Highlight	Yang Yo-seob (42)
I-dle	Minnie (1, 62, 100)
I-dle	Yuqi (12)
I-dle	Miyeon (64, 122)
I-dle	Soyeon (99)
Illit	Minju (136)
Illit	Yunah (170)
Infinite	Kim Sung-kyu (69)
Infinite	Nam Woo-hyun (95)
Itzy	Lia (22)
Itzy	Yeji (74)
Itzy	Chaeryeong (96)
Ive	Liz (6, 112)
Ive	Rei (26, 112)
Ive	Leeseo (58)
Ive	An Yu-jin (203)
Izna	Choi Jung-eun (160)
Izna	Bang Jee-min & Ryu Sa-rang (235)
Kep1er	Kim Chae-hyun (34)
Kep1er	Huening Bahiyyih (43)
KickFlip	Donghyeon (209)
KickFlip	Kyehoon (236)
KiiiKiii	Kya (177)
KiiiKiii	Sui (199)
Kiss of Life	Belle (93, 227)
Kiss of Life	Natty (134, 227)
Kiss of Life	Julie (168, 227)
Kiss of Life	Haneul (201, 227)
Le Sserafim	Kim Chae-won (11, 215)
Le Sserafim	Huh Yunjin (33)
Le Sserafim	Kazuha (156)
Meovv	Narin (190)
Meovv	Gawon (218)
Monsta X	Kihyun (10, 233)
Monsta X	Joohoney (45)
Monsta X	Shownu (179)
NCT	Xiaojun (15) (WayV)
NCT	Doyoung (59) (NCT 127 / NCT DoJaeJung)
NCT	Chenle (107) (NCT Dream)
NCT	Jaehyun (129) (NCT 127 / NCT DoJaeJung)
NCT	Ten (158) (WayV)
NCT	Jaehee (180) (NCT Wish)
NCT	Haechan (230) (NCT 127 / NCT Dream)
NCT	Renjun (242) (NCT Dream)
NewJeans	Hanni (46)
NewJeans	**Danielle (75)**
NiziU	Miihi (83)
NiziU	Nina (159)
Nmixx	Lily (29, 100, 186)
Nmixx	Haewon (55, 186)
Nmixx	Sullyoon (71, 186)
Nmixx	Bae (97, 186)
Nmixx	Jiwoo (128, 186)
Nmixx	Kyujin (157, 186)
Nowz	Yoon and Jinhyuk (173)
Oh My Girl	YooA (37)
Oh My Girl	Seunghee (73)
P1Harmony	Keeho (101)
P1Harmony	Theo (206)
Red Velvet	Wendy (88)
Red Velvet	Seulgi (167)
Rescene	Minami (211)
Rescene	Liv (240)
Seventeen	Seungkwan (14)
Seventeen	Hoshi (60)
Seventeen	Jun (78)
Seventeen	Dino (91)
Seventeen	DK (197)
SF9	Jaeyoon (47)
SF9	Inseong (127)
Shinee	Taemin (86)
Shinee	Key (132)
Shinee	Onew (149)
STAYC	Sieun (23)
STAYC	Isa (50)
STAYC	J (121)
STAYC	Seeun (174)
Stray Kids	Seungmin (2)
Stray Kids	Han (32)
Stray Kids	I.N (65)
Stray Kids	Lee Know (123)
The Boyz	Sangyeon (53, 118)
The Boyz	New (89, 118)
The Boyz	Jacob (118)
The Boyz	Sunwoo (138)
The Boyz	Hyunjae (162)
Tomorrow X Together	Taehyun (4, 243)
Tomorrow X Together	Huening Kai (108)
Tomorrow X Together	Yeonjun (204)
TWS	Dohoon (142)
TWS	Youngjae (161)
TWS	Kyungmin (212)
Viviz	Umji (20)
Viviz	Eunha (48)
Viviz	SinB (172)
Zerobaseone	**Zhang Hao (87)**
Zerobaseone	Sung Han-bin (114)
Zerobaseone	Kim Tae-rae (154)

== Episodes ==
=== 2022 ===
List of episodes in 2022 (Episodes 1-42)
Ep.	Guest		Song		Air date
Ep.	Name	Group	Title name	Original performer	Air date
1	Minnie	I-dle	**"Senorita"** (Note: Sung by Lee Mu-jin only); "Ain't About Love"; "Propose"; "Be Be Your Love"; "Traffic Light" (sung in Thai); "Lost Stars"	I-dle; Jae Jin; Sunwoo Jung-a; Rachael Yamagata; Lee Mu-jin; Adam Levine	22 February 2022
2	Seungmin	Stray Kids	**"Levanter"**; "Behind the Page"; "Drunken Truth"; "HeeJae"; "My Sea"	Stray Kids; Kwon Jin-ah; Kim Dong-ryul; Sung Si-kyung; IU	1 March 2022
3	Seori	–	**"The Long Night"**; "Drivers License"; "Tomboy"; "Spring Day"; "For Lovers Who Hesitate"	Seori feat. Giriboy; Olivia Rodrigo; Hyukoh; BTS; Jannabi	8 March 2022
4	Taehyun	Tomorrow X Together	**"Crown"**; "LA Girls"; "Over and Over Again"; "10,000 Hours"	Tomorrow X Together; Charlie Puth; Nathan Sykes feat. Ariana Grande; Dan + Shay feat. Justin Bieber	15 March 2022
5	Be'O	–	**"Casually"**; "Hug Me"; "Limousine"; "Missing You"	Be'O; Crush feat. Gaeko; Be'O feat. Mino; 2NE1	22 March 2022
6	Liz	Ive	**"Eleven"**; "Beautiful"; "Bye Bye My Blue"; "Midnight Flying"	Ive; Crush; Baek Ye-rin; Remake by Cho Kyu-hyun of orig. song by Lee Moon-sae	29 March 2022
7	Suho	Exo	**"Overdose"**; "Grey Suit"; "Good Night"; "Instinctively Love Poetry"	Exo; Suho; Denzel Curry feat. Nell and Twelve'Len; Yoon Jong-shin and Drunken Tiger	5 April 2022
8	Soyou	–	**"I Swear"**; "Clockwork"; "Four Seasons"; "Twenty-five Twenty-one"	Sistar; Lim Jeong-hee; Taeyeon; Jaurim	12 April 2022
9	Jung Seung-hwan	–	**"The Snowman"**; "Old Song"; "If We Love Again"; "Cat"	Jung Seung-hwan; Kim Dong-ryul; Do Won-kyung; Sunwoo Jung-a feat. IU	19 April 2022
10	Kihyun	Monsta X	**"Jealousy"**; **"Voyager"**; "All of Me"; "Draw You"	Monsta X; Kihyun; Michael Bublé; Ra.D, D.ear, Brother Su, and Joo Young	26 April 2022
11	Kim Chaewon	Le Sserafim	**"Fearless"**; "I Love You 3000"; "Bambi"; "Polaroid Love"	Le Sserafim; Stephanie Poetri; Baekhyun; Enhypen	3 May 2022
12	Yuqi	I-dle	**"Tomboy"**; "Thinking 'Bout You; "Someday, The Boy"; "1, 2, 3, 4"	I-dle; Dua Lipa; Kim Feel; Lee Hi	10 May 2022
13	Sohee (Note: She participated in the show "Baby Singer" with Lee Mu-jin as a mentor.)	–	"Traffic Light"; "When It Snows"; "Crosswalk Song"	Lee Mu-jin; Lee Mu-jin feat. Heize; JunyTony	17 May 2022
14	Seung-kwan	Seventeen	**"Darl+ing"**; "Track 9"; "The Dreamers Dream"; "Tree"	Seventeen; Lee So-ra; Lee Seung-gi; Car, the Garden feat. Youra	24 May 2022
15	Xiaojun	NCT (WayV)	**"Make a Wish (Birthday Song)"**; "Ashes"; "End of a Day"; "Thinking Out Loud"	NCT; Celine Dion; Jonghyun; Ed Sheeran	31 May 2022
16	Heeseung	Enhypen	**"Tamed-Dashed"**; "Sofa"; "Camping Everywhere"; "Secret Garden"	Enhypen; Crush; George; Lee Sang-eun	7 June 2022
17	Somin	Kard	**"Gunshot"**; "Holy"; "Happy"; "Stay"	Kard; Justin Bieber feat. Chance the Rapper; Taeyeon; Blackpink	14 June 2022
18	Son Dong-woon	Highlight	**"Today's Weather"**; "Stalker"; "A Flying Butterfly"; "You Were Beautiful"	Son Dong-woon; 10cm; YB; Day6	21 June 2022
19	Hayoung and Jiwon	Fromis 9	**"DM"**; Hayoung: "You Already Have"; Jiwon: "Adult"; All: "Time Lapse"	Fromis 9; Kwon Jin-ah; Sondia; Taeyeon	28 June 2022
20	Umji	Viviz	**"Bop Bop!"**; "Love Dive"; "What a Wonderful World"; "Dive into You"	Viviz; Ive; Louis Armstrong; NCT Dream	5 July 2022
21	George	–	**"Whenever Wherever"**; "This Ain't It"; "Even Though You Said So Easily"; "Ordinary People"	George; John Park; Yoon Sang; John Legend	12 July 2022
22	Lia	Itzy	**"Sneakers"**; "Tango"; "Passing By"; "Falling Slowly"	Itzy; Abir; Lee Hi; Glen Hansard and Markéta Irglová	19 July 2022
23	Sieun	STAYC	**"Beautiful Monster"**; "The Letter"; "Lovin' You"; "If Only"	STAYC; Kim Kwang-jin; Minnie Riperton; Sung Si-kyung	26 July 2022
24	Jongho	Ateez	**"Turbulence"**; "Don't Go Today"; "Another You"; "Ocean Waves"	Ateez; Im Se-jun; Brian McKnight; Yang Da-il feat. Nlve	2 August 2022
25	Swan	Purple Kiss	**"Nerdy"**; "Halo"; "Why So Lonely"; "Can't Take My Eyes Off You"	Purple Kiss; Beyoncé; Wonder Girls; Frankie Valli	9 August 2022
26	Rei	Ive	**"Love Dive"**; "Joah"; "11:11"; "Boat"	Ive; Jay Park; Taeyeon; George	30 August 2022
27	Kim Jae-hwan	–	**"Someday"**; "Every Day, Every Moment"; "Start Over"; "Pierrot Laughs at Us"	Kim Jae-hwan; Paul Kim; Gaho; U Sung-eun and Kwon Min-je	6 September 2022
28	Yena	–	**"Smiley"**; "My First and Last"; "Hello"; "I Don't Care"	Yena feat. Bibi; NCT Dream; Huh Gak; 2NE1	13 September 2022
29	Lily	Nmixx	**"Dice"**; "Psycho"; "Hello"; "Butter"; "How Can I Love the Heartbreak, You're the One I Love"	Nmixx; Red Velvet; Adele; BTS; AKMU	20 September 2022
30	Lee Chang-sub	BtoB	**"Surrender"**; "How I Am"; "The Flight"; "Things to Do Tomorrow"	Lee Chang-sub; Kim Dong-ryul; Yim Jae-beom; Sung Si-kyung	27 September 2022
31	Sunwoo Jung-a	–	**"Black Coffee"**; "Cookie"; **"Beyond My Dreams"**; "Ganadara"	Sunwoo Jung-a; NewJeans; Sunwoo Jung-a; Jay Park	4 October 2022
32	Han	Stray Kids	**"Case 143"**; "Alcohol Free"; "Blue Whale"; "A Long Dream"	Stray Kids; Twice; YB; Se So Neon	11 October 2022
33	Huh Yunjin	Le Sserafim	**"Antifragile"**; "Nappa"; "Slow"; "Our Summer"	Le Sserafim; Sole; Crush; Tomorrow X Together	18 October 2022
34	Kim Chae-hyun	Kep1er	**"Good Night"**; "All About You"; "Simple"; "Blue"	Kep1er; Taeyeon; Seventeen; Bolbbalgan4	25 October 2022
35	Jo Yu-ri	–	**"Glassy"**; "Fine"; "Jump"; "Consolation"	Jo Yu-ri; Taeyeon; Kim Dong-ryul; Kwon Jin-ah	1 November 2022
36	Baekho	–	**"No Rules"**; "Passing"; "Burinake"; "Every Moment of You"	Baekho; Kim Bum-soo; Exy; Sung Si-kyung	8 November 2022
37	YooA	Oh My Girl	**"Selfish"**; "Hype Boy"; "Better"; "22"; "Strawberry Moon"	YooA; NewJeans; BoA; Taylor Swift; IU	15 November 2022
38	Roy Kim	–	**"Take Me Back in Time"**; "If We Ever Meet Again"; "After Like"; "Heejae"	Roy Kim; Lim Young-woong; Ive; Sung Si-kyung	22 November 2022
39	Kwon Jin-ah	–	**"Stupid Love"**; "The Wind Is Blowing"; "Illusion"; "That's Hilarious"	Kwon Jin-ah; Lee So-ra; Aespa; Charlie Puth	29 November 2022
40	John Park	–	**"Love Again"**; "Privacy"; "Myrthen Op.25-1 Widmung"; "Man in the Mirror"; "Only"; "Snow"	John Park; Baekhyun; Robert Schumann; Michael Jackson; Lee Hi; Zion. T and Lee Moon-sae	6 December 2022
41	Jeong Se-woon	–	**"Say Yes"**; "Eight"; "Traffic Light" (saxophone version); "Don't Know Why"; "Ohio"	Jeong Se-woon; IU; Lee Mu-jin; Norah Jones; Crush	13 December 2022
42	Yang Yo-seob	Highlight	**"Pretty"**; "Phonecert"; "Going Home"; "Limit"	Yang Yo-seob; 10cm; Kim Yoon-ah; Nell	20 December 2022
Bold denotes own / group song.

=== 2023 ===
List of episodes in 2023 (Episodes 43-94)
Ep.	Guest		Song		Air date
Ep.	Name	Group	Title name	Original performer	Air date
44	Sanha	Astro / Moonbin & Sanha	**"Wind"**; "Event Horizon"; "Hurt"; "Becoming Dust"; "Shiny Star (2020)"	Moonbin & Sanha; Younha; NewJeans; Kim Kwang-seok; KyoungSeo	3 January 2023
45	Joohoney	Monsta X	**"Gambler"**; "You"; "Hold On, We're Going Home"; "Antifragile"; "A Little Girl"	Monsta X; G.Soul; Drake; Le Sserafim; Oh Hyuk	10 January 2023
46	Hanni	NewJeans	**"OMG"**; "Just a Feeling"; "WA-R-R"; "Through the Night"; "Lucky"	NewJeans; S.E.S; Colde; IU; Jason Mraz and Colbie Caillat	17 January 2023
47	Jaeyoon	SF9	**"Puzzle"**; "About Thirty"; "Love Poem"; "Cry Me a River"; "Still"; "Pet"	SF9; Kim Kwang-seok; Musical number from Fantastic Fairy Tale; Michael Bublé; Brian McKnight; 10cm	24 January 2023
48	Eunha	Viviz	**"Pull Up"**; "Mattress"; "She Said"; "Hello, Digimon" (Korean version); "Honey"	Viviz; 10cm; Toy; Kim Joo-hee; Kara	31 January 2023
49	Jung In	–	**"After the Uphill Road"**; "Hug Me"; "Rainy Season; "When I Move"; "Holo"	Jung In; Jung Joon-Il; Jung In; Kara; Lee Hi	7 February 2023
50	Isa	STAYC	**"Teddy Bear"**; "West Coast"; "Vibe"; "Mama Do (Uh Oh, Uh Oh)"; "Instagram"	STAYC; Emotional Oranges; Taeyang feat. Jimin of BTS; Pixie Lott; Dean	14 February 2023
51	Yesung	Super Junior	**"Together"**; "Don't Say Goodbye"; "Seasons"; **"It Has to Be You"**; "Look At Me"	Yesung; Lee Seung-chul; Wave to Earth; Yesung; George	21 February 2023
52	Hwang Min-hyun	–	**"Hidden Side"**; "Love Again"; "You Wouldn't Answer My Calls"; "Prologue"; "From January to June"	Hwang Min-hyun; Baekhyun; 2AM; Shin Sung-woo; Yoon Jong-shin	28 February 2023
53	Sangyeon	The Boyz	**"Roar"**; "Let's Go Picnic"; "Ribbon in the Sky"; "Break Me Down"	The Boyz; George; Stevie Wonder; Hyun Jin-young	7 March 2023
54	Big Naughty	–	**"Hopeless Romantic"**; "My Old Story"; "Dali, Van, Picasso"; "Standing Under the Shade of a Roadside Tree"; "I Was Able to Eat Well"	Big Naughty; IU; Beenzino; Lee Moon-sae; Homme	14 March 2023
55	Haewon	Nmixx	**"Love Me Like This"**; "I Got Lucky"; "Demons; "Miroh"; "0310"; "Dream"	Nmixx; Kwon Jin-ah; Imagine Dragons; Stray Kids; Baek Ye-rin; Suzy and Baekhyun	21 March 2023
57	Jung Eun-ji	Apink	**"D N D"**; "It Was Love"; "What the Spring?"; "Lonely Night"	Apink; Zico feat. Luna of f(X); 10cm; Remake by Kwon Jin-ah of orig. song by Boohwal	4 April 2023
58	Leeseo	Ive	**"Blue Blood"**; "Bungee"; "Take a Bow"; "Star"; "Make Up"	Ive; Baekhyun; Rihanna; 15&; Sam Kim	11 April 2023
59	Doyoung	NCT (NCT 127 / NCT DoJaeJung)	**"Perfume"**; "The Lonely Bloom Stands Alone"; "Hotel California"; "28 Reasons"; "It's Strange, With You"	NCT DoJaeJung; Hynn; Eagles; Seulgi; Acoustic Collabo	18 April 2023
60	Hoshi	Seventeen	**"F*ck My Life"**; "11:11"; "It Has To Be You"; "Control Me"; "Left and Right"	Seventeen; Taeyeon; Yesung; Colde; Charlie Puth	25 April 2023
61	Ha Hyun-sang	-	**"Time and Trace"**; "A Thousand Years"; "Kitsch"; "The Blower's Daughter"; "When My Loneliness Calls to You"	Ha Hyun-sang; Christina Perri; Ive; Damien Rice; Jang Pill Soon	2 May 2023
63	Kwon Jung-yeol	10cm	**"My Ultimate First Love"**; "Square (2017)"; "I'm Yours" (Note: Lee Mu-jin joined); "Even If The World Tricks You"; "Geek in the Pink"	10cm; Baek Ye-rin; Jason Mraz; Kim Jang-hoon; Jason Mraz	16 May 2023
64	Miyeon	I-dle	**"Queencard"**; "When This Rain Stops"; "She Said"; "Teenage Fantasy"; "Feel Special"	I-dle; Wendy; Toy feat. Kwon Jin-ah; Jorja Smith; Twice	23 May 2023
65	I.N	Stray Kids	**"Hug Me"**; "I Don't Love You"; "Perfect"; "Busan Seagull"; "Good Night Good Dream (GNGD)"	I.N; Urban Zakapa; 10cm; Moon Sung-jae; Nerd Connection	30 May 2023
66	Kim Feel	–	**"Love You! (Solo Ver.)"**; "White Night"; "Song"; **"Cry"**; "One Last Cry"	Kim Feel; Zitten; Kim Dong-ryul; Kim Feel; Brian McKnight	6 June 2023
67	Lee Seo-yeon	Fromis 9	**"#menow"**; "I Hate You"; "All In My Head"; "I Guess I Loved You"; "Don't Come Back"; "You and I"	Fromis 9; Woodz; Tori Kelly; Yoon Do-hyun; Heize feat. Yong Jun-hyung; Park Bom	13 June 2023
68	Hongjoong	Ateez	**"Bouncy (K-Hot Chilli Peppers)"**; "Starman"; "Tomorrow"; "Cupid"; "Billie Jean"	Ateez; David Bowie; Tablo feat. Taeyang; FIFTY FIFTY; Michael Jackson	20 June 2023
69	Kim Sung-kyu	Infinite	**"Small Talk"**; "Green Nocturne"; "Love"; "Myeondong Calling"; "Eyes, Nose, Lips"	Kim Sung-kyu; Nell; Keyshia Cole; Car, the Garden; Taeyang	27 June 2023
70	Maki	&Team	**"Firework (Korean ver.)"**; "Sriracha"; "Don't Forget"; "It's You"; "OMG"	&Team; Marteen; Crush ft. Taeyeon; Sam Kim ft. Zico; NewJeans	4 July 2023
71	Sullyoon	Nmixx	**"Roller Coaster"**; "Waiting"; "Let's Say Goodbye"; "Joke's On You"; "Singing Got Better"; "Perhaps Love"	Nmixx; Younha; Parc Jae-jung; Charlotte Lawrence; Ailee; OST for Princess Hours by HowL feat. J	11 July 2023
72	Winter	aespa	**"I'm Unhappy"**; "London"; "Standing Under the Shade of a Roadside Tree"; "Confetti"; "Ordinary Confession" / **"Spicy"**; "Farewell Under the Sun"	aespa; Baek Ye-rin; Lee Moon-sae; Tori Kelly; Lee Mu-jin / aespa; Park Jin-young ft. Sunye	18 July 2023
73	Seunghee	Oh My Girl	**"Summer Comes"**; "Feeling Good"; **"Dolphin"**/**"Nonstop"** (folk music versions); "Love Me or Leave Me"; "Hurting Name"; "200%"	Oh My Girl; Cover by Michael Bublé of orig. song by Cy Grant; Oh My Girl; Day6; Ann One; AKMU	25 July 2023
74	Yeji	Itzy	**"Cake"**; "Red Lipstick"; "Everybody Hurts Sometimes"; "eight"; "I'm Gonna Love You"	Itzy; Lee Hi ft. Yoon Mi-rae; Pixie Lott; IU ft. Suga; D.O. ft. Wonstein	1 August 2023
75	Danielle	NewJeans	**"ASAP"**; "Across the Universe"; "Part of Your World" (Korean version); "Only Hope"; "The Show"; "Written in the Stars"	NewJeans; Baek Ye-rin; OST by Danielle and Mu-jin for The Little Mermaid; OST by Mandy Moore for A Walk To Remember; Lenka; John Legend ft. Wendy	8 August 2023
76	Sohyang	-	"Aegukga (South Korean National Anthem)"; "Memory of the Wind"; **"Higher"**; "I Am"; "Perfect"	music by Ahn Eak-tai; Naul; Sohyang; Ive; Ed Sheeran	15 August 2023
77	Jihyo	Twice	**"Killin' Me Good"**; "Thought of You"; "Tango"; "Kill Bill"; "Inevitability"	Jihyo; John Park; Abir; SZA; Urban Zakapa	22 August 2023
78	Jun	Seventeen	**"Limbo (Korean ver.)"**; "Lie, Lie, Lie"; "No One Told Me Why"; **"Circles"**; "Drive It Like You Stole It"	Jun; Lee Juck; Aleph; Seventeen; OST for Sing Street	29 August 2023
79	Kim Se-jeong	-	**"Top or Cliff"**; "Ice Fortress"; "Let It Go"; "A Thousand Winds"; "Hopeless Romantic"	Kim Se-jeong; Dear Cloud; OST by Idina Menzel for Frozen; Lim Hyung-joo; Big Naughty ft. Lee Su-hyun	5 September 2023
80	Jung Yong-hwa	CNBLUE	**"Your City"**; "Lonely"; "Geek in the Pink"; "Rose Blossom"; "Ditto" (instrumental version); "No Celestial"	Jung Yong-hwa; 2NE1; Jason Mraz; H1-KEY; NewJeans; Le Sserafim	12 September 2023
81	D.O.	Exo	**"Somebody"**; "Supermarket Flowers"; "Through the Night" / "Every Moment of You"; "Falling Like the Stars"; "Expectations"; "Goodbye Summer"	D.O.; Ed Sheeran; IU / Sung Si-kyung; James Arthur; Na Yoon-kwon; f(x) ft. D.O.	26 September 2023
82	Young K	Day6	**"Nothing But"**; "Just the Two of Us"; "Sunday Morning"; "Willing to Forget"; "Three Leaf Clover"; "Ditto"	Young K; music by Grover Washington Jr., vocals by Bill Withers; Maroon 5; Kim Kwang-seok; Young K (unreleased); NewJeans	3 October 2023
83	Miihi	NiziU	**"Paradise (Korean ver.)"**; "One Last Time"; "Step and a Step"; "Be as ONE"; "Give You My Heart"; "Snow Flower"; "All For You"	NiziU; Ariana Grande; NiziU; Twice; OST by IU for Crash Landing on You; OST by Park Hyo-shin for I'm Sorry, I Love You; OST by Seo In-guk & Jung Eun-ji for Reply 1997	10 October 2023
84	Chuu	-	**"Howl"**; "Fox Rain"; "As I Stop"; "Say You Love Me"; "Ordinary Confession" / "Mr. Chu"; "Sleepless in Seoul"	Chuu; Lee Sun-hee; U Sung-eun; Remake by MYMP of orig. song by Patti Austin; Lee Mu-jin / Apink; 10cm ft. Lee Su-hyun	17 October 2023
85	Lee Seok-hoon	SG Wannabe	**"Lasting Scent"**; "A Walk"; "In Bloom"; "Can't We"; "Trip"; "Only Look at Me"; "Aside"	Lee Seok-hoon; Baek Ye-rin; Zerobaseone; Realslow; Leellamarz ft. Hannah; Taeyang; Shinee	24 October 2023
86	Taemin	Shinee	**"Guilty"**; "You Touched My Heart"; "Your Scent"; "Clean Up"; "Into the New World"	Taemin; Sung Si-kyung; Yoo Young-jin; The Ray; Girls' Generation	31 October 2023
87	Zhang Hao	Zerobaseone	**"Always"**; "Rain"; "I Love You"; "So Bad"; "Dynamite" (instrumental version); "Epiphany"	Zhang Hao; Taeyeon; Position; STAYC; BTS; Jin	7 November 2023
88	Wendy	Red Velvet	**"Chill Kill"**; "Illusion"; "The Moon of Seoul"; "I Have Nothing"; "Love On Top"; "On a Night Like Tonight"	Red Velvet; Park Ji-yoon; Kim Gun-mo; OST by Whitney Houston for The Bodyguard; Beyoncé; Park Jeong-un	14 November 2023
89	New	The Boyz	**"Watch It"**; "First Day"; "U R"; "Wait"; Various fragments (Note: "Spicy" / "God of Music" / "Slow Dancing / "Love Always Runs Away" / "The Painted on the Moonlight"); "Celebrity"	The Boyz; Eco Bridge ft. Naul; Taeyeon; Exo; Various (Note: Aespa / Seventeen / V / Lim Young-woong); IU	21 November 2023
90	Bang Ye-dam	-	**"Miss You"**; **"Only One"**; "Like Mike"; "Farting King Pung Pung"; "Man in the Mirror"; "Troll"; "OMG; "Love Never Felt So Good"	Bang Ye-dam; Bang Ye-dam; Tone Stith; Bboongbboong-E; Michael Jackson; IU ft. Dean; NewJeans; Michael Jackson ft. Justin Timberlake	28 November 2023
91	Dino	Seventeen	**"Wait"**; "See You Again"; "Heal the World"; "Looking at the Photo"; "Rush Hour"; "Ride"	Dino; Baek Ye-rin; Michael Jackson; Vibe; Crush ft. J-Hope; Taeyang	5 December 2023
92	Heize	-	**"Lips"**; "Forest"; "Episode"; "White"; "When It Snows"	Heize; Choi Yu-ree; Lee Mu-jin; Fin.K.L; Lee Mu-jin ft. Heize	12 December 2023
93	Belle	Kiss of Life	**"Says It"**; "Ring Tone"; "Unforgiven"; "Lee Mu-jin Service Theme Song"; "Plastic Off the Sofa"; "When This Rain Stops" / "Shut Down"; "Like I'm Gonna Lose You"	Kiss of Life; Lyn; Le Sserafim; Belle; Beyoncé; Wendy / Blackpink; Meghan Trainor ft. John Legend	19 December 2023
94	Ahn Ji-young	BOL4	**"Eternal Love"**; "Last Christmas"; "Have Yourself a Merry Little Christmas"; "Valerie"; "Every Moment of You"; **"Snowball"**; "Yeowooya (Lady in the Rainy Night)"	BOL4; Wham!; Frank Sinatra; Remake by Mark Ronson ft. Amy Winehouse; Sung Si-kyung; BOL4; The Classic	26 December 2023
Bold denotes own / group song.

=== 2024 ===
List of episodes in 2024 (Episodes 95–146)
Ep.	Guest		Song		Air date
Ep.	Name	Group	Title name	Original performer	Air date
95	Nam Woo-hyun	Infinite	**"Baby, Baby"**; "Breath"; "Drama"; "Let's Say Goodbye"; "Tears"; "Hey"	Nam Woo-hyun; Park Hyo-shin; Aespa; Parc Jae-jung; So Chan-whee; Paul Kim	2 January 2024
96	Chaeryeong	Itzy	**"Untouchable"**; "Ring My Bell"; "Tears That Didn't Fall"; "Nonsense"; "Jjanjjara"; "When This Night Passes"	Itzy; OST by Bae Suzy for Uncontrollably Fond; Lim Jeong-hee; Sabrina Carpenter; Jang Yoon-jeong; Yim Jae-beom	9 January 2024
97	Bae	Nmixx	**"Dash"**; "I'm a Mess"; "Only Wanna Give It to You"; "Wi Ing Wi Ing"; Various fragments (Note: Included "Snowman" / City of Stars / Rolling in the Deep); "I Love You"	Nmixx; Bebe Rexha; Elle Varner ft. J. Cole; Hyukoh; Various (Note: Sia / OST by Emma Stone & Ryan Gosling for La La Land / Adele); 2NE1	16 January 2024
98	Meenoi	-	**"NDGGA"**; "Boys Like Girls"; Episode / **"and you"**; "What If She Wants You"; "To You Who Don't Love Me"	Meenoi; Leellamarz ft. Gist and Jayci Yucca; Lee Mu-jin / Meenoi; John Splithoff; Lee So-ra	24 January 2024 (Note: The episode was delayed one day due to technical issues.)
99	Soyeon	I-dle	**"Fate"**; "It Hurts (Slow)"; "This Love"; **"Not Enough"**; "Love in the Milky Way Café"	I-dle; 2NE1; Remake by BigBang of orig. song by Maroon 5; Soyeon (unreleased); 10cm	30 January 2024
101	Keeho	P1Harmony	**"Killin' It"**; "Only"; "Normal Girl"; "Checklist"; "Die 4 You"; "And July"	P1Harmony; Lee Hi; SZA; MAX ft. Chromeo; Dean; Heize ft. DJ Friz and Dean	13 February 2024
102	Bibi	-	**"Bam Yang Gang"**; "Midnight Flying"; "Untitled Song"; "Diamonds Are a Girl's Best Friend"; "Sugarcoat"; "Spooky"	Bibi; Lee Moon-sae; Bibi (unreleased); OST by Marilyn Monroe for Gentlemen Prefer Blondes; Kiss of Life (Natty solo); Remake by Dusty Springfield of orig. song by Classics IV	20 February 2024
103	Kim Min-seok	MeloMance	**"Eternal Sunshine"**; "Is It Still Beautiful"; **"Gift"**; "I Am"; "Freely"; "Patbingsu"; "Try Again"	Kim Min-seok; Toy ft. Kim Yeon-woo; MeloMance; Ive; Kwak Jin-eon; Yoon Jong-shin; Jaehyun & d.ear	27 February 2024
104	Daesung	BigBang	**"Falling Slowly"**; "Alone in Love"; **"Look at Me, Gwisun"** / **"It's a Big Hit!"**; "Lose Control"; "Vibe"; "If You"	Daesung; Kim Gun-mo; Daesung; Teddy Swims; Taeyang ft. Jimin; BigBang	5 March 2024
105	Kim Bum-soo	-	**"Journey"**; "Some Yearning"; **"The World of You"**; "Through the Night"; "What Are the Friends For"	Kim Bum-soo; Lee Eun-mi; Kim Bum-soo; IU; Park Hyo-shin ft. Kim Bum-soo	12 March 2024
106	Jeong Dong-won (JD1)	-	**"Who Am I"**; "The Assignment Song" / "Even Though My Heart Hurts"; "Artist"; "Today"; "Bam Yang Gang"; "Beyond Love"	JD1; Lee Mu-jin / Fly to the Sky; Zico; O.When; Bibi; Big Naughty ft. 10cm	19 March 2024
107	Chenle	NCT (NCT Dream)	**"Unknown"**; "The Rose"; "This Is Love (这,就是爱)"; "I Believe"; "Drunk Text"	NCT Dream; OST by Bette Midler for The Rose; Jason Zhang; OST by Shin Seung-hun for My Sassy Girl; Henry Moodie	26 March 2024
108	Huening Kai	Tomorrow X Together	**"Deja Vu"**; "Ghost Town"; "I'm Yours"; "Mercy; "A Flying Butterfly"; "Mommae"; "Gravity"	Tomorrow X Together; Benson Boone; Jason Mraz; Shawn Mendes; YB; Jay Park ft. Ugly Duck; John Mayer	2 April 2024
109	Hwiseo	H1-Key	**"Rose Blossom"**; "Welcome to the Show"; "I Love You 3000"; "Episode" (beatboxing version); "You & Me"; "Spring is Gone by Chance"; "Love, ing"	H1-KEY; Day6; Stephanie Poetri; Lee Mu-jin; Jennie; Yuju ft. Loco; Ben	9 April 2024
110	Taesan	BoyNextDoor	**"Dear. My Darling"**; "Reality"; "Englishman in New York"; "One Call Away"; "Friday"; "Without You"	BoyNextDoor; OST by Richard Sanderson for La Boum and Sunny; Sting; Charlie Puth; IU; 1TYM	16 April 2024
111	Seowon	Unis	**"Superwoman"**; "Way Back Home"; "Beautiful Night"; "Fate"; "Superwoman" / "My Brother"; "Give Love"	Unis; Shaun; Ulala Session; I-dle; Unis / Geum Jan-di; AKMU	23 April 2024
112	Rei and Liz	Ive	Liz & Rei: **"HEYA"**; Liz: "Love Wins All"; Rei: "A Man Like Me"; Rei: "Bam Yang Gang"; Liz & Rei: "Stay Beautiful"; Mujin & Liz: "Propose"; All: "Plot Twist"	Ive; IU; Crush; Bibi; Jamie; Lee Mu-jin; TWS	30 April 2024
113	Jay Park	-	**"Your/My"**; "Get You"; "Billie Jean"; "Love, That Common Word"; "Paris in the Rain"	Jay Park; Daniel Caesar; Michael Jackson; Kim Yeon-woo; Lauv	7 May 2024
114	Sung Han-bin	Zerobaseone	**"Good Night"**; **"Feel the POP"**; "Something Between Us"; "Free"; "Time for the Moon Night"; "Magnetic"; "What 2 Do"	Zerobaseone; Zerobaseone; George; Xydo; GFriend; Illit; Dean ft. Crush & Jeff Bernat	14 May 2024
115	Choi Yu-ree	-	**"It's Been a While"**; "Farewell, Neverland"; "Bad Boy"; "Cat"; **"Promise"**; "Meaning of You"	Choi Yu-ree; Tomorrow X Together; Red Velvet; Sunwoo Jung-a ft. IU; OST by Choi Yu-ree for Queen of Tears; IU ft. Kim Chang-wan	21 May 2024
116	Ningning	aespa	**"Thirsty"**; "Be Natural"; "Good Thing"; "Paper Hearts"; "Me, Myself and I; "Breath"	aespa; S.E.S.; Zedd & Kehlani; Tori Kelly; Beyoncé; SM the Ballad (sung by Taeyeon and Kim Jong-hyun)	28 May 2024
117 (Note: First ever episode with an audience. The episode was recorded on May 22, 2024 at KOBA 2024: 32nd Korea International Broadcasting Media, Audio & Lighting Show.)	Solar	Mamamoo	**"But I"**; **"Décalcomanie"**; **"Piano Man"**; "Flowers"; "Some"	Solar; Mamamoo; Mamamoo; Miley Cyrus; Soyou & Junggigo ft. Lil Boi	4 June 2024
118	Sangyeon, Jacob & New	The Boyz	Guests: **"Reveal"**; Mu-jin: **"Nectar"**; Sangyeon: "As the First Impression"; New: "Love Wins All"; Jacob: "Better"; All: "Letting Go"	The Boyz; The Boyz; Lee So-ra; IU; Zayn Malik; Day6	11 June 2024
119	Hyuk	Tempest	**"Can't Stop Shining"**; "Please Don't Change"; "Adore U"; "Sudden Shower"; "Beautiful"; "Never Ending Story"	Tempest; Jungkook ft. DJ Snake; Seventeen; OST by Eclipse for Lovely Runner; OST by Crush for Guardian: The Lonely and Great God; Boohwal	18 June 2024
120	Kwon Eun-bi	-	**"Underwater"**; **"Sabotage"**; "Audition (Time2Rock)"; "Romantic Cat"; "Galaxy"; **"Colors"**; "Festival"	Kwon Eun-bi; Kwon Eun-bi; Younha; Cherry Filter; Bolbbalgan4; Kwon Eun-bi; Uhm Jung-hwa	25 June 2024
121	J	STAYC	**"Cheeky Icy Thang"**; "Put It Straight"; "New Rules"; "Tell Me You Love Me"; "Speechless"; "The Long Night"	STAYC; I-dle; Dua Lipa; Bolbbalgan4; OST by Naomi Scott for Aladdin; Seori ft. Giriboy	2 July 2024
122	Miyeon	I-dle	**"Klaxon"**; "Because of You"; "To. X"; **"The Painted on the Moonlight"**; **"Hann (Alone in Winter)"**	G-Idle; Yoon Mi-rae; Taeyeon; OST by Miyeon for My Dearest; G-Idle	9 July 2024
123	Lee Know	Stray Kids	**"Twilight"**; "Come Back To Me Again"; "Thorn"; "Only One"; "Rap Impossible"; "The One I Cannot Have"	Stray Kids; Byun Jin-sub; Buzz; BoA; Hyungdon and Daejun; Bank	16 July 2024
124	Ha Sung-woon	-	**"Blessed"**; "Solar System"; "That I Was Once By Your Side"; "Honesty"; **"Gift"**; "Bubble Gum"	Ha Sung-woon; Sung Si-kyung; Toy; Pink Sweat$; OST by Ha Sung-woon for Lovely Runner; NewJeans	23 July 2024
125	Rami	BabyMonster	**"Forever"**; "City Burns"; "Crazy"; "Bloodsucker"; "My Love"; "Last Goodbye"	BabyMonster; Andra Day; Gnarls Barkley; CIL; Route 94 ft. Jess Glynne; AKMU	30 July 2024
126	Wooyeon	Wooah	**"Rollercoaster"**; "Gone"; "Red Sunset Glow"; "Violet Fragrance"; "Willing to Forget"	Wooah; Rosé; Lee Moon-sae; Kang Susie; Kim Kwang-seok	6 August 2024
127	Inseong	SF9	**"Don't Worry, Be Happy"**; "To My Youth"; "Sim (One's Heart)"; "Stupid Love"; "Do You Know"; "Boom Boom Bass"	SF9; Bolbbalgan4; Yarn; Kwon Jin-ah; Remake by The One of orig. song by Jo Sung-mo; Riize	13 August 2024
128	Jiwoo	Nmixx	**"See That?"**; "1, 2, 3, 4"; "11:11"; "Greedy"; **"Dash"**; "Merry-Go-Round"; "Shut Up & Groove"	Nmixx; Lee Hi; Taeyeon; Tate McRae; Nmixx; Sokodomo ft. Zion.T & Wonstein; Heize ft. Dean	20 August 2024
129	Jaehyun	NCT (NCT 127 / NCT DoJaeJung)	**"Smoke"**; "Lemonade"; "A Whole New World"; "Because I Love You"; "Fair-Weather Friend"	Jaehyun; Jeremy Passion; OST by Brad Kane & Lea Salonga for Aladdin; Yoo Jae-ha; Bruno Major	27 August 2024
130	Christopher	-	**"When I Get Old"**; **"Bad"**; **"Nothing in Common"**; "Waiting on the World to Change"; "Small Girl"; **"It Could Have Been Us"**	Christopher ft. Chungha; Christopher; Christopher; John Mayer; Lee Young-ji ft. D.O.; Christopher ft. Griff	3 September 2024
131	Riwoo	BoyNextDoor	**"20"**; "Day After Day"; "Love on My Heart"; "Bad Habits"; "That's What I Like"; "Exhausted"	BoyNextDoor; Moon Myung-jin ft. Jeong Yeon-jung; Yoo Jae-ha; Ed Sheeran; Bruno Mars; Yoon Jong-shin ft. Kwak Jin-eon & Kim Feel	10 September 2024
132	Key	Shinee	**"Pleasure Shop"**; "Memories"; "Supernova"; "Used to Be Young"; "Get A Guitar"	Key; Conan Gray; Aespa; Miley Cyrus; Riize	24 September 2024
133	Doha	ARrC	**"Alien in Seoul"**; "Never Not"; "An Encore"; "Spot!"; "Talk Saxy"	ARrC; Lauv; Shinee; Zico ft. Jennie; Riize	1 October 2024
134	Natty	Kiss of Life	**"Sugarcoat"**; **"R.E.M"**; "Losing You"; "We Were in Love"; "Coming of Age Story"; "Officially Missing You"	Kiss of Life (Natty solo); Kiss of Life; FLO; Lyn; Lee Mu-jin; Tamia	8 October 2024
135	Hui	Pentagon	**"Nameless"**; "Who"; "Already One Year"; "Armageddon"; "Coming of Age Story" (sung by Hui); "Seed"	Hui ft. Jang Hye-jin; Jimin; Brown Eyes; Aespa; Lee Mu-jin; Taeyang	15 October 2024
136	Minju	Illit	**"Magnetic"**; "Like I Do"; "Fate"; "Smiling Angel"; "First"	Illit; Awa; Lee Sun-hee; Sung Si-kyung; Jooyoung ft. SOLE	22 October 2024
137	Karina	Aespa	**"Flowers"**; "Do You Know That?"; "I Choose You"; "Mama Do (Uh Oh, Uh Oh)"; **"Up"**; "One Late Night in 1994"; Fly Me to the Moon; "Surrender"	Aespa; E Hyuk; Kiana Ledé ft. Pell; Pixie Lott; Karina; Jang Hye-jin; Remake by Frank Sinatra of orig. song by Kaye Ballard; Chancellor ft. Lyn	29 October 2024
138	Sunwoo	The Boyz	**"bAd"**; "I Like Me Better"; "Predator"; "I'm In Love"; **"Cream"**; "RomanceYouthLove"	The Boyz; Lauv; Zico ft. Jtong; Ra.D; Sunwoo; ESEGYE	5 November 2024
139	San	Ateez	**"Enough"**; "The Fool"; Day6 Medley (Note: Includes fragments of "Welcome to Show", "Congratulations", and "You Were Beautiful".); "Guilty"; "Moondance"; "Counting Stars"	Ateez; Jung Seung-hwan; Day6; Dynamic Duo; Remake by Michael Bublé of orig. song by Van Morrison; OneRepublic	12 November 2024
140	Ahyeon	Babymonster	**"Love, Maybe"**; "vampire"; "I Did It"; "HateLove"; "Untitled, 2014"; "Flower Road"	Babymonster; Olivia Rodrigo; DJ Khaled ft. Others (Note: Post Malone, Megan Thee Stallion, Lil Baby & DaBaby); Alex Porat; G-Dragon; BigBang	15 November 2024 (Note: Episode aired on a Friday instead of the usual airing day)
142	Dohoon	TWS	**"Last Festival"**; "Don't Forget"; "Eyes, Nose, Lips"; "Think of Christmas"; "Beside You"; "Hug"	TWS; Crush ft. Taeyeon; Taeyang; Anne-Marie; Keshi; Seventeen	26 November 2024
143	Lee Seung-gi	-	**"Return"**; "You Are Tearful"; **"Will You Marry Me?"**; **"Because You're My Woman"**; "Ordinary Confession"; "Happy"; "The First Snow"	Remake by Lee Seung-gi ft. Lyn; M.C the Max; Lee Seung-gi; Lee Seung-gi; Lee Mu-jin; Day6; Exo	10 December 2024
144	Jamie	-	**"Bad Luck"**; "Honey"; "1-800-hot-n-fun"; "Circle of Life"; "I Always Wanted A Brother"	Jamie; Kehlani; Le Sserafim; OST by Carmen Twillie ft. Lebo M for The Lion King; OST (Note: by Braelyn Rankins, Theo Somolu, Aaron Pierre and Kelvin Harrison Jr.) for Mufasa: The Lion King	17 December 2024
145	Taeyeon	Girls' Generation	**"Letter to Myself"**; "December 32 Days"; "As Time Goes By"; **"I'm All Ears"**; "Blue Christmas"; "If It Was You"	Taeyeon; Byul; Yoon Mi-rae; Taeyeon; Remake by Kelly Clarkson of orig. song by Doye O'Dell; OST by Jung Seung-hwan for Another Miss Oh	24 December 2024
Bold denotes own / group song.

=== 2025 ===
List of episodes in 2025 (Episodes 147–196)
Ep.	Guest		Song		Air date
Ep.	Name	Group	Title name	Original performer	Air date
147	Junkyu	Treasure	**"Going Crazy"**; "Get You"; "Englishman in New York"; "Some"; "Feel Special"; "Café"	Treasure; Daniel Caesar; Sting; Bolbbalgan4; Twice; BigBang	7 January 2025
148	Jung Ji-so	WSG Wannabe	**"At That Moment"**; "Something Between Us"; "Spring Days Pass"; "Just A Feeling"; "She's Smiling"; "Every Moment With You"	WSG Wannabe (Gaya-G); George; Sim Soo-bong; S.E.S.; Kim Hyung-jung; Jaessbee	14 January 2025
149	Onew	Shinee	**"Winner"**; "Ordinary People"; "Nessun dorma"; "To. X"; "Stalker"	Onew; John Legend; Aria by Giacomo Puccini for Turandot; Taeyeon; 10cm	21 January 2025
150	Jay B & Choi Young-jae	Got7	Both Guests: **"Yours Truly"**; Youngjae: "Stupid Love"; Jay B: "A Song Nobody Knows"; Jay B: "Just Friends (Sunny)"; Youngjae: "Run With Me"; Youngjae: "Supernova"; Jay B: "Bubble Pop!"; All: "The Moon of Seoul"	Got7; Kwon Jin-ah; Colde; Musiq Soulchild; Sunwoo Jung-a; Aespa; Hyuna; Kim Gun-mo	28 January 2025
151	Ahn Shin-ae	-	**"South To The West"**; "Supernatural"; "I Love My Body"; "Summer Is For Falling In Love"; "Episode" (Doo-wop version); "Stop!"; "Apt."	Ahn Shin-ae; NewJeans; Hwasa; Sarah Kang; Lee Mu-jin; Sam Brown; Rosé & Bruno Mars	4 February 2025
152	Lee Sung-kyung	-	"A Whole New World"; "Marry Me"; "Picture Show"; "Love Without Pain"; "A Million Miles Away" (Korean version)	OST by Naomi Scott & Mena Massoud for Aladdin; Yangpa; Musical number from Bonnie & Clyde; OST by Choi Yu-ree for Call It Love; OST by Lee Sung-kyung & Lee Mu-jin for Aladdin	11 February 2025
153	Minkyun	ONF	**"The Stranger"**; "The Way You Make Me Feel"; "Coming of Age Story"; "Drunken Truth"; "Atlantis Princess"; "Lee Mu-jin Service Theme Song"; "Back for More"	ONF; Michael Jackson; Lee Mu-jin; Kim Dong-ryul; BoA; Minkyun; Tomorrow X Together & Anitta	18 February 2025
154	Kim Tae-rae	Zerobaseone	**"Blue"**; "I'm Firefly"; "Memories Resemble Love"; "Freeze"; "Highlight"; Congratulatory Song Medley (Note: Included fragments of "It's Fortunate", "Ten Reasons I Love You", and "Marry Me"); "Old Song"	Zerobaseone; Remake by Hwang Ga-ram of orig. song by Lunch; Park Hyo-shin; Parody song for Squid Game season 2; Touched; Various (Note: Lee Juck, Lee Seok-hoon, and Maktub); Standing Egg	25 February 2025
155	Ahn Tae-gyu	Dragon Pony	**"Morse Code"**; "Blue Whale"; "Cry Out"; "Love Me Right"; "In Dreams"; "The Blower's Daughter"	Dragon Pony; YB; One Ok Rock; Exo; Lena Park; Damien Rice	4 March 2025
156	Kazuha	Le Sserafim	**"Impurities"**; **"Come Over"**; "Suffer"; "A Dream Is a Wish Your Heart Makes"; "Into My Heart"; "Angel"	Le Sserafim; Le Sserafim; Charlie Puth; OST by Lily James for Cinderella; Lee So-ra; Chancellor ft. Taeyeon	11 March 2025
157 (Note: Lee Mu-jin did not attend the taping of this show. Guest performed alone.)	Kyujin	Nmixx	**"Know About Me"**; "Motivation"; "Hello"; "Sugar"; "Only"	Nmixx; Normani; Adele; 15&; Lee Hi	18 March 2025
158	Ten	NCT (WayV)	**"Stunner"**; "Love Never Felt So Good"; "So Sick"; "When Love Passes By"; **"Butterfly"**; "Better"	Ten; Michael Jackson; Ne-Yo; Lee Moon-sae; Ten; BoA	1 April 2025
159	Nina	NiziU	**"What If"**; "Nobody Love"; "S-Class"; "Tears Didn't Fall"; "Good Day"; "Greeting"	NiziU; Tori Kelly; Stray Kids; Lim Jeong-hee; IU; Byul ft. Na Yoon-kwon	8 April 2025
160	Choi Jung-eun	Izna	**"Sign"**; "Traffic Light" (whistling version); "Melt Away"; "Die with a Smile"; "All In My Head"; "Speechless"; "Rule Of The Princess (Prod. Gwana)"; "My Old Story"	Izna; Lee Mu-jin; Taeyeon; Lady Gaga & Bruno Mars; Tori Kelly; OST by Naomi Scott for Aladdin; haebom; IU	15 April 2025
161	Youngjae	TWS	**"Countdown!"**; "Thirsty"; "Chewing Gum"; "Four Seasons"; "No Make Up"; "Checklist"	TWS; Aespa; NCT Dream; Taeyeon; Zion.T; MAX ft. Chromeo	22 April 2025
162	Hyunjae	The Boyz	**"Rock And Roll"**; "I Think About You"; "I Love You"; "7 Years of Love"; "I Couldn't..."; "Just 10 Centimeters"	The Boyz; One More Chance; Tim; Cho Kyu-hyun; Sung Si-kyung; 10cm & Big Naughty	29 April 2025
163	Jo Se-ho & Nam Chang-hee	ChoNam Zone	**"Don't Say Goodbye"**; Nam Chang-hee: "A Letter"; Both Guests: "Again & Again"; Jo Se-ho: "The Flight"; All: "Lalala"	ChoNam Zone; Bumjin; 2PM; Yim Jae-beom; SG Wannabe	6 May 2025
164	Sungho	BoyNextDoor	**"Next Mistake"**; "Beautiful Things"; "Mirotic"; "On The Street"; "Sunday Morning"; "Rewrite the Stars"; "Time Spent Walking Through Memories"	BoyNextDoor; Benson Boone; TVXQ; Sung Si-kyung; Maroon 5; OST by Zac Efron & Zendaya for The Greatest Showman; Nell	13 May 2025
165	Baekhyun	Exo	**"Elevator"**; "Golden Hour; "Love Foolosophy"; "By My Side"; AI Medley (Note: Included fragments of "Little Star", "Sun Or Suck", and "Sugarcoat".); "If I Have You Only"	Baekhyun; Jvke; Jamiroquai; Junny; Various (Note: Standing Egg, Woodz, and Kiss of Life (Natty solo).); Remake by Nerd Connection of orig. song by Loveholics	20 May 2025
166	Yoo Hwe-seung	N.Flying	**"Everlasting"**; "Secret"; "Bird On The Edge" / "Everlasting"; "When This Rain Stops"; "Open Arms"	N.Flying; Boohwal; Lee Mu-jin / N.Flying; Wendy; Journey	27 May 2025
167	Seulgi	Red Velvet	**"Tilt"**; "Drowning"; "Greatest Love of All"; "Don't Tell Me It's Not Love"; "A Perfect Day to Say I Love You"; "Can't Love You Anymore"	Red Velvet – Irene & Seulgi; Woodz; Remake by Whitney Houston of orig. song by George Benson; Lee So-ra; Younha; IU & Oh Hyuk	3 June 2025
168	Julie	Kiss of Life	**"Lips Hips Kiss"**; "On My Mind"; "You Broke Me First"; "Memories... (Smiling Tears)"; "Who You?"	Kiss of Life; Jorja Smith ft. Preditah; Tate McRae; Yoon Mi-rae; G-Dragon	10 June 2025
169	Seonghwa	Ateez	**"Lemon Drop"**; "Palette"; "So Beautiful"; "The Door"; **"Matz"**; "Sugar Sweet"	Ateez; IU ft. G-Dragon; DPR Ian; Jukjae; Ateez (Hongjoong & Seonghwa); Benson Boone	17 June 2025
170	Yunah	Illit	**"Night Picnic"**; "Love Countdown"; "Spring Love"; "Good Thing"; "Bohemian Rhapsody"; "Curtain Call"	Illit; Nayeon ft. Wonstein; Eric Nam & Wendy; Zedd & Kehlani; Queen; Taeyeon	24 June 2025
171	Jungmo & Woobin	Cravity	Both Guests: **"Set Net G0?!"**; Jungmo: "Confession"; Woobin: "The Way To Say Goodbye"; Jungmo: "Stalker"; Woobin: "I'm Not Sorry"; Both Guests: "Amusement Park"; All: "Confession"	Cravity; George; Lim Han-byul; 10cm; Dean ft. Eric Bellinger; Baekhyun; Delispice	1 July 2025
172	SinB	Viviz	**"La La Love Me"**; "A Journey"; "Be Yourself"; "Desire and Resent"; "Because I'm Stupid"; "Romeo N Juliet"	Viviz; Wonpil (Day6); Project song for The Haunted House; As One; OST by SS501 for Boys Over Flowers; Clazziquai Project	8 July 2025
173	Yoon & Jinhyuk	Nowz	Both Guests: **"Everglow"**; Yoon: "When The Day Comes"; Both Guests: "+82Pressin'"; Jinhyuk: "WA-R-R"; Yoon: "It Was Love"; Jinhyuk: "Do Ma Thang"; All: "Mikrokosmos"	Nowz; OST by Tomorrow X Together for Resident Playbook; Mark ft. Haechan; Colde; Zico ft. Luna; Penomeco; BTS	15 July 2025
174	Seeun	STAYC	**"I Want It"**; "See You Again"; "It's A Good Thing"; "7 Years"; "Playing With Fire"; "Cocktail Love"	STAYC; Yerin Baek; Navi; Lukas Graham; Blackpink; Marronnier	22 July 2025
175	Lim Seul-ong	2AM	**"Rainbow Light"**; "Hot"; "Ribbon in the Sky"; "Magic Castle"; **"Nagging"**; "Flower"	Lim Seul-ong; Le Sserafim; Stevie Wonder; The Classic; IU & Lim Seul-ong; Johnny Stimson	29 July 2025
176	Keita	Evnne	**"How Can I Do"**; "Youngblood"; "Let's Get It Started"; "Zombie"; "Soda Pop"; "You Are the Reason"	Evnne; 5 Seconds of Summer; Black Eyed Peas; Day6; OST by Saja Boys for KPop Demon Hunters; Calum Scott	5 August 2025
177	Kya	KiiiKiii	**"Dancing Alone"**; "Come Back Home"; "Not Sorry"; "Million Reasons"; "The Assignment Song"; "Why So Lonely"	KiiiKiii; 2NE1; Lee Young-ji ft. pH-1; Lady Gaga; Lee Mu-jin; Wonder Girls	12 August 2025
179	Shownu	Monsta X	**"Catch Me Now"**; "I'm Firefly"; "Bad Dreams"; "Jinu's Entrance"; **"Got My Number"**	Monsta X; Remake by Hwang Ga-ram of orig. song by Lunch; Teddy Swims; OST for KPop Demon Hunters; Monsta X	2 September 2025
180	Jaehee	NCT (NCT Wish)	**"Color"**; "Diary"; "Marry Me"; "Dried Flower"; "Mirotic"; "Don't Go"	NCT Wish; Van Gwang-ok; Maktub; Yuuri; TVXQ; Exo	9 September 2025
181	Kim Min-jae	Idid	**"Chan-Ran"**; "What Am I"; "Love Yourself"; "Ego"; "You In My Arms"	Idid; Why Don't We; Justin Bieber; Crush; Yoo Jae-ha	16 September 2025
182	Lee Jun-young	U-KISS	**"Why Are You Doing This To Me"**; "Drunken Truth"; "I Regret It"; "Hold Me In Your Heart" (Korean ver.); "You You You"	Lee Jun-young; Exhibition; 4Men; Musical number in Kinky Boots; Fly to the Sky	23 September 2025
183	Lee Hyun	-	**"Let You Go"**; "Because I Am A Common Man"; "Superstar"; "Love Wins All"; "0X1=Lovesong (I Know I Love You)"; **"You Are The Best Of My Life"**	Lee Hyun; Park Hyo-shin; Version by Luther Vandross; IU; Tomorrow X Together ft. Seori; Lee Hyun	26 September 2025
184	Chen	Exo	**"Deja-Vu"**; "Home Sweet Home"; "For You"; "Cold"; OST Medley (Note: Included fragments of "For You", "Best Luck", and "Everytime"); "To Reach You"	Chen; Car, the Garden; The Cross; Lee Ki-chan; Various (Note: OSTs by Chen from Moon Lovers: Scarlet Heart Ryeo, It's Okay, That's Love, and Descendants of the Sun); 10cm	30 September 2025
185	Lee Hae-ri & Kang Min-kyung	Davichi	Both Guests: **"Time Capsule"**; Lee Hae-ri: "U R"; Lee Mu-jin: **"Unspoken Words"**; Both Guests: "Coming Of Age Story"; Kang Min-kyung: "Hug Me"; All: "How Can I Love The Heartbreak..."	Davichi; Taeyeon; Davichi; Lee Mu-jin; Jung Joon-il; AKMU	7 October 2025
186	Nmixx		Lee Mu-jin: **"Roller Coaster"**; Guests: **"Blue Valentine"**; Haewon: "Snow Flower"; Bae: "Wait a Minute!"; Lily: "Drivers License"	Nmixx; Nmixx; Park Hyo-shin; Willow Smith; Olivia Rodrigo	Part 1: 14 October 2025
186	Nmixx		Lily: "Let's Say Goodbye"; Mu-jin & Kyujin: "Dandelion"; Jiwoo & Sullyoon: "When Night Is Falling"; All: "Her"	Parc Jae-jung; Oohyo; Punch; Block B	Part 2: 15 October 2025
187	Woonhak	BoyNextDoor	**"As Time Goes By"**; "How Deep?"; "UN Village"; "Shouldn't Have..."; "Whiplash"; "An Ordinary Day"	BoyNextDoor; Tai Verdes; Baekhyun; Baek A-yeon ft. Young K; Aespa; g.o.d	21 October 2025
188	Tomoya	Nexz	**"Next To Me"**; "Love Me Less"; "Again & Again"; "That's Okay"; "Aloha"	Nexz; Max Schneider ft. Quinn XCII; 2PM; D.O.; Cool	28 October 2025
189	Chiquita	Babymonster	**"Supa Dupa Luv"**; "Bye Bye My Blue"; "Ghost Town"; "Traitor"; "I Love You 3000"	Babymonster; Yerin Baek; Benson Boone; Olivia Rodrigo; Stephanie Poetri	4 November 2025
190	Narin	Meovv	**"Burning Up"**; "Feet Don't Fail Me Now"; "Idontwannabeyouanymore"; "Love Is All I Know"; "Stay"	Meovv; Joy Crookes; Billie Eilish; Sim Soo-bong; Rihanna ft. Mikky Ekko	11 November 2025
191	Yihyun	Baby DONT Cry	**"F Girl"**; "Whatever You Do"; "Dear Name"; "Love Condition"; "Father"; "Kiss Me"	Baby DONT Cry; Crush ft. Gray; IU; Younha; Psy; Sixpence None the Richer	18 November 2025
192	Kim Jong-kook	-	**"Forgive Me Remember Me"**; "Drowning"; "Still With You"; **"One Man"**	Kim Jong-kook; Woodz; Jung Kook; Kim Jong-kook	25 November 2025
193	Wonpil	Day6	**"A Journey"**; "Blue Valentine"; "Till The End"; "Across The Universe"; "I Do"	Wonpil; Nmixx; Kim Bum-soo; Yerin Baek; Rain	2 December 2025
194	Gyubin	-	**"Cappuccino"**; "Love Attack"; Lee Mu-jin Medley; "When My Loneliness Calls to You"; "Psycho"; "On A Rainy Day"	Gyubin; Rescene; Lee Mu-jin; Jang Pill Soon; Red Velvet; Younha	9 December 2025
195	Martin	Cortis	**"Lullaby"**; "Thinking Out Loud"; "Deja Vu"; "I Didn't Know Yet"; "Haru Haru"; "Nan Chun"	Cortis; Ed Sheeran; Tomorrow X Together; Lee Juck; BigBang; Se So Neon	16 December 2025
196	Jaurim		**"Life!"**; "Guilty"; "Luminous"; **"Idol"**; **"Forever And Ever"**	Jaurim; Taemin; Doyoung; Jaurim; Jaurim	23 December 2025
Bold denotes own / group song.

=== 2026 ===
List of episodes in 2026 (Episodes 197–present)
Ep.	Guest		Song		Air date
Ep.	Name	Group	Title name	Original performer	Air date
197	DK	Seventeen	**"Blue**"; "Some Day In The 21st Century"; "Peppermint Candy"; "Home"; "For Life"	DxS (DK & Seungkwan); Remake by Lucy of orig. song by Peppertones; YB; Sandeul; Exo	13 January 2026
198	Jake	Enhypen	**"Sleep Tight"**; "Like a Star"; "Love Yourself"; "On The Street"; "WA-R-R"; "Young & Alive"	Enhypen; Corinne Bailey Rae; Justin Bieber; Leellamarz ft. Ash Island; Colde; Bazzi	20 January 2026
199	Sui	KiiiKiii	**"404 (New Era)**"; "Only One"; "When A Girl"; "Stardust"; "Confession"	KiiiKiii; BoA; Aviva Mongillo; Younha; Park Hye-kyung	27 January 2026
200	Yunho	Ateez	**"Choose"**; "Yukon"; "Toy"; "Your Ocean"; "Burn the House Down"	Ateez; Justin Bieber; Block B; Hoppipolla; AJR	3 February 2026
201	Haneul	Kiss of Life	**"No One But Us**"; "Oort Cloud"; "0310"; "Jane Doe"; "Ending Scene"; "Love Is Gone"	Kiss of Life; Younha; Yerin Baek; OST by Kenshi Yonezu & Hikaru Utada for Chainsaw Man; IU; Slander ft. Dylan Matthew	10 February 2026
202	Seo Da-hyun	TripleS	**"Girls Never Die**"; "Some Nights"; TripleS Unit Medley (Note: Included fragments of "Girls' Capitalism" by sub-unit Lovelution, "Fly Up" by sub-unit Neptune, and "Door" by sub-unit Aria.); "Wish"; "Listen"; "Ugly"	TripleS; Taeyeon; TripleS; Younha; Beyoncé; 2NE1	17 February 2026
203	An Yu-jin	Ive	**"Rebel Heart**"; "Landing In Love"; "Let It Be"; "Perfect"; "Umbrella"; "Text Me Merry Christmas"	Ive; Hanroro; Cho Yong-pil; Ed Sheeran; Epik High ft. Younha; Straight No Chaser ft. Kristen Bell	24 February 2026
204	Yeonjun	Tomorrow X Together	**"Let Me Tell You"**; "I'm In Love"; "Talk Me Down"; "Scott And Zelda"; "Love Is You"; "As The First Impression"	Yeonjun ft. Daniela Avanzini; Ra.D; Troye Sivan; Bibi; Chrisette Michele; Lee So-ra	3 March 2026
205	Bome & Seohyeon	AtHeart	Both Guests: **"Shut Up**"; Seohyeon: "Fry's Dream"; Bome: "It Was Love"; Mu-jin & Seohyeon: "Die For You"; Mu-jin & Bome: "Is Anybody There?"; All: "Twenty-Five, Twenty-One"	AtHeart; AKMU; Zico ft. Luna; The Weeknd; Han Young-ae; Jaurim	10 March 2026
206	Theo	P1Harmony	**"Wednesday Girl"**; **"EX (Spanish version)"**; "Will We Be A Melody"; "Missing You"; "Back In Time"; "I Know Where The Rainbow Has Fallen"; "Monodrama"	P1Harmony; P1Harmony; Nerd Connection; 2NE1; OST by Lyn for Moon Embracing the Sun; Jannabi; Huh Gak ft. Yoo Seung-woo	17 March 2026
207	Jeong Sun-ah, Cha Ji-yeon & Kim Ho-young (Note: Musical actors promoting the Korean version of the musical Lempicka.)		Jeong Sun-ah: **"Unseen"**; Cha Ji-yeon: **"Don't Bet Your Heart"**; Kim Ho-young: **"Pari Will Always Be Pari"**; Sun-ah: "I Will Always Love You"; Ji-yeon: "Drowning"; Ho-young: **"Hoylish"**; Sun-ah: "Popular"; Ji-yeon: **"The Most Beautiful Bracelet"**; Sun-ah: **"Woman Is"**; All: "Don't Worry"	Musical number of Lempicka; Musical number of Lempicka; Musical number of Lempicka; Remake by Whitney Houston of orig. song by Dolly Parton; Woodz; Kim Ho-young; Musical number of Wicked; Musical number of Lempicka; Musical number of Lempicka; Jeon In-kwon	24 March 2026
208	Sunhye	Young Posse	**"Skyline"**; "Moonwalkin'"; "Shanghai Romance"; "Derre"; "One More Step"; "Joker"	Young Posse; Lngshot; Orange Caramel; Bibi; Yoon Sang; Big Naughty ft. Jamie	31 March 2026
209	Donghyeon	KickFlip	**"Secret Nightmare**"; "Malibu Nights"; "Baby"; "0+0"; "Stay A Little Longer"; "I Need You"	KickFlip; LANY; Justin Bieber ft. Ludacris; Hanroro; Rosé; Ovan	7 April 2026
210	Dayoung	WJSN	**"What's A Girl To Do"**; "Back To You"; "Material Girl"; "Fox Rain"; "Leave the Door Open"	Dayoung; Tyla; Madonna; OST by Lee Sun-hee for "My Girlfriend Is a Gumiho"; Silk Sonic	14 April 2026
211	Minami (Note: With special appearances by Rescene members Liv and Zena, who were interviewed by Mu-jin during a segment of the show.)	Rescene	**"Runaway**"; "If It Were Me"; "Bambi"; "My Gospel"; "Timeless"	Rescene; Na Yoon-kwon; Baekhyun; Charlie Puth; Remake by Zhang Liyin & Kim Junsu of orig. song by Kelly Clarkson & Justin Guarini	21 April 2026
212	Kyungmin	TWS	**"You, You"**; "FaceTime"; "Dance the Night Away"; "Never Goodbye"; "Acid Dreams"; "Come To Me"	TWS; Lngshot; Twice; NCT Dream; Max Schneider & Felly; Bang Ye-dam	28 April 2026
213	Keonho	Cortis	**"Blue Lips**"; "Great Pretender"; "Swap It Out"; "My Whole World"; "Live Forever"; "When My Loneliness Calls to You"	Cortis; Dominic Fike; Justin Bieber; Car, the Garden; Oasis; Jang Pill Soon	5 May 2026
214	Tiffany Young	Girls' Generation	**"Summer's Not Over"**; **"I Just Wanna Dance"**; "Be My Summer"; "Running"; "Hero"; "Forever With You"	Tiffany Young; Tiffany Young; Snoh Aalegra; Yoon Sang; Mariah Carey; Lee Moon-sae	12 May 2026
215	Kim Chaewon	Le Sserafim	**"Celebration**"; "So Easy (To Fall in Love)"; T-ara Medley (Note: Included fragments of "Day by Day", "TTL (Time to Love)", and "Bo Peep Bo Peep".); "Joy, Sorrow, A Beautiful Heart"; **"Need Your Company**"; "Don't Be Afraid To Fall"	Le Sserafim; Olivia Dean; T-ara; AKMU; Le Sserafim; Hanroro	19 May 2026
216	Leo	Alpha Drive One	**"OMG!"**; "Folded"; "Slow Motion"; "Baby I Need You"; "Daisies"; "Blue"	Alpha Drive One; Kehlani; Karina Pasian; Jannabi; Justin Bieber; BigBang	26 May 2026
217	Park Jin-young	Got7	**"Everlove**"; "You're So..."; **"You Calling My Name"**; "All of Me"; "Risk It All"; "Lie, Lie, Lie"	Park Jin-young; Sung Si-kyung; Got7; John Legend; Bruno Mars; Lee Juck	29 May 2026 (Note: Episode aired on a special day)
218	Gawon	Meovv	**"Ddi Ro Ri"**; "Paparazzi"; "Blue Lights"; "As Time Goes By"; "Blueming"; "Beautiful"	Meovv; Lady Gaga; Jorja Smith; Yoon Mi-rae; IU; Bazzi	2 June 2026
219	Leehan	BoyNextDoor	**"Viral**"; "Sway"; "Only"; "Love Over Hip-Hop, Money Over Love"; "Rude!"; "I Like Me Better"	BoyNextDoor; Michael Bublé; Lee Hi; Noahjooda ft. Basick; Hearts2Hearts; Lauv	9 June 2026
220	Sohee	Riize	**"Soar"**; "Attention"; "Baby Baby"; "Versace on the Floor"; "Renegades"; "Ego"; "Butterfly Grave"	Riize; Charlie Puth; 4Men; Bruno Mars; One Ok Rock; Crush; Take	16 June 2026
221	Wooyoung	Ateez	**"Toxin**"; "Two Melodies"; "Bansanka"; "Garosu-gil At Dawn"; "Darling"	Ateez; Zion.T ft. Crush; Tuki; Baek Ji-young ft. Song Yuvin; Taeyang	23 June 2026
222	Evan	-	**"Ride Or Die"**; **"Overflow"**; "Day 1"; "Save Your Tears"; "Eyes, Nose, Lips"; "Hidden Road"	Evan; Evan; Honne; The Weeknd; Taeyang; Yoo Jae-ha	30 June 2026
223	Son Seung-yeon & Tei (Note: Promoting the Korean version of the musical Hell's Kitchen.)		Tei: **"If I Ain't Got You"**; Song Seung-yeon: **"Kaleidoscope"**; Tei: **"Not Even the King"** (Korean ver.); Song Seung-yeon: **"The River"**; Tei: "Farewell Once Again"; Song Seung-yeon: "Radio Silence"; All: "Beautiful Day"	Musical number of Hell's Kitchen; Musical number of Hell's Kitchen; Musical number of Hell's Kitchen; Musical number of Hell's Kitchen; Sung Si-kyung; Dragon Pony; Urban Zakapa	7 July 2026
224	Kim Eun-sung	Idntt	**"Kids Return"**; "Still Here"; "Bad"; "My Love By My Side"; "Love Sick"; "Instagram"; "Paradise of Rumors"	Idntt; Jung Seung-hwan; Christopher; Kim Hyun-sik; F.T. Island; Dean; AKMU	14 July 2026
225	Lee Chae-young	Fromis_9	**"Vitamin ME**"; "Bye Bye My Blue"; "The Moon Of Seoul"; "U R"; "Full Moon"; "The Blue Night Of Jeju Island"	Fromis_9; Yerin Baek; Kim Gun-mo; Taeyeon; Sunmi; Choi Sung-won	21 July 2026
226	Jungsu	Xdinary Heroes	**"Voyager"**; "Amnesia"; "Lifetime"; "Four Times Around The Sun"; **"FiRE (My Sweet Misery)"**; "Can't Get Over You"; "Can't Stop"	Xdinary Heroes; Woodz; Justin Bieber; Nell; Xdinary Heroes; OST by Paul Kim for Queen of Tears; CNBLUE	28 July 2026
227	Kiss of Life		Mu-jin: **"Midas Touch"**; KIOF: **"Sweat"**; Belle: "For You"; Julie & Natty: "The Weekend"; Haneul: "Every Heart"; KIOF: "I Really Like You"; All: "My Type"	Kiss of Life; Kiss of Life; Lee Hi ft. Crush; Bibi; BoA; Jewelry; iKon	4 August 2026
228	Na Yeong-joo	Dodree	**"Four-Season Love Letter"**; "Lion"; "Die with a Smile"; "Run With Me"; "Villain"	Dodree; I-dle; Lady Gaga & Bruno Mars; Sunwoo Jung-a; Stella Jang	11 August 2026
229	So Soo-bin	-	**"Should've Told You It's Okay**"; "Seed"; "Even Though My Heart Hurts"; "Love Attack"; "You Back To Me"; "Truly"	So Soo-bin; Taeyang; Fly to the Sky; Rescene; Byun Jin-sub; Kim Kwang-jin	18 August 2026
230	Haechan	NCT (NCT 127 / NCT Dream)	**"127 Million Miles"**; "The Lady"; "The Way You Make Me Feel"; "A Beautiful Farewell"; "I Need A Girl"; "Playboy"	NCT 127; 2LSON ft. Bumkey & Dok2; Michael Jackson; Kim Gun-mo; Taeyang ft. G-Dragon; Exo	25 August 2026
231	Anxin	Alpha Drive One	**"Born Dire**"; "Dive Into You"; "For Life"; "The Little Prince"; "Whiplash"; "Blue Valentine"	Alpha Drive One; NCT Dream; Exo; Kim Ryeo-wook; Aespa; Nmixx	1 September 2026
232	Donggyu	Tunexx	**"Blue Mode"**; "I Will Give You All"; "Childlike"; "Ohio"; "Ego Talkin'"; "Deja Vu"; "With Me"	Tunexx; Lee Seung-chul; John Park; Crush; Saint Harison; Rescene; Vincent Blue & Yang Da-il	8 September 2026
233	Kihyun	Monsta X	**"Sweet Night, Sweet Morning"**; "Popcorn"; "My Starry Love"; "Let Me Love My Youth"; **"Howling"**; "Thought Of You"	Monsta X; Doh Kyung-soo; Lim Young-woong; Hanroro; Kihyun; John Park	15 September 2026
235	Bang Jee-min & Ryu Sa-rang	Izna	Both Guests:**"Rock, Paper, Scissors"**; Jee-min: "Don't Come Back"; Sa-rang: "Savior"; Jee-min: "Skyfall"; Sa-rang: "Last Dance"; Both Guests: "Yesterday"; All: "Stay"	Izna; Heize ft. Yong Jun-hyung; Lee Hi ft. B.I; OST by Adele for Skyfall; BigBang; Block B; Blackpink	29 September 2026
236	Kyehoon	KickFlip	**"Puzzle Piece"**; "No Pain"; "Night"; "It's Love"; "Empty"; "Vancouver 2"	KickFlip; Silica Gel; dori; Mose; Winner; Big Naughty	6 October 2026
237	Kim Jung-hyun	-	**"Like The First Snow"**; "Grown Ups"; "Slow Dancing in the Dark"; "Take Care"; "Love, Maybe"	OST by Kim Jung-hyun for Mr. Queen; OST by Sondia for My Mister; Joji; Sung Si-kyung; OST by MeloMance for Business Proposal	13 October 2026
238	Crush	-	**"Seesaw"**; "Ending Scene"; "I Just Called to Say I Love You"; **"Ego"**; "Easy"; "When You Fall"	Crush ft. IU; IU; Stevie Wonder; Crush; Mac Ayres; Sam Kim ft. Lee Soo-jung	22 October 2026
239	Yoo Seung-eon	And2ble	**"Worth It"**; "End Of A Day"; "The Lonely Bloom Stands Alone"; "Amusement Park"; "Pretender"; "Burning Sunset"	And2ble; Jonghyun; Hynn; Baekhyun; Official Hige Dandism; Ha Hyun-sang	27 October 2026
240	Liv	Rescene	**"With"**; "You're Different"; "Rough"; "Beautiful Moment"; "Nothing's Gonna Change My Love for You"; "What's The Matter?"	Rescene; OST by Han Ye-seul for Nonstop Season 4; GFriend; K.Will; George Benson; Kim Hyun-chul	4 November 2026
241	Minjae	Xikers	**"Sanctuary"**; **"Dienamite"**; "Drowning"; "Guilty"; "Make Up"; "Such A Thing"; "You're The One"	Xikers; Xikers; Bobby ft. Sole; Dynamic Duo; Sam Kim ft. Crush; Hwayobi; J.Y. Park	7 November 2026
242	Renjun	NCT (NCT Dream)	**"Tumbler"**; "All About You"; "Magic Castle"; "Meet Him Among Them"; "No. 1"; "Speechless"	NCT Dream; OST by Taeyeon for Hotel del Luna; The Classic; Lee Sun-hee; BoA; Standing Egg	10 November 2026
243	Taehyun	Tomorrow X Together	**"Angel Bite"**; "I Have A Girlfriend"; "Rock with You"; "The Day We Met Again"; "With Me"; "A Fool Of Tears"	Tomorrow X Together; J.Y. Park; Michael Jackson; Wheesung; Wheesung; BigBang	17 November 2026
Bold denotes own / group song.

=== Special episodes ===
Ep.	Guest		Song		Air date
Ep.	Name	Group	Title name	Original performer	Air date
–	Mujin	–	"Astronaut"; "Reference"	Lee Mu-jin	27 June 2022
43	Huening Bahiyyih	Kep1er	"Propose"; "Dice"; "Beautiful Monster"; "Love Dive"; "Last Christmas"	Sunwoo Jung-a; Nmixx; STAYC; Ive; Wham!	27 December 2022
56	Jimin	BTS	April Fools' Day Special Medley (Note: Included fragments of "Lie Lie Lie", "Lies", "Lies, "Fake Love", and "Lies"); **"Like Crazy" (English Version)**; "Butterfly"	Various (Note: Lee Juck, g.o.d, T-ara, BTS, and by BigBang); Jimin; BTS	1 April 2023
62 (Note: Episode hosted by Minnie (I-dle))	Mujin	-	**"Traffic Light"** (sung in Thai); **"Ordinary Confession"**; "Ain't About Love"; **"When It Snows"**	Lee Mu-jin; Lee Mu-jin; Jae Jin; Lee Mu-jin feat. Heize	9 May 2023
100	Minnie / Bang Ye-dam / Lily	I-dle / - / Nmixx	All: "Episode"; Lily: "I Am"; Bang Ye-dam: "That's Hilarious"; Minnie: "Confetti"; Mu-jin & Ye-dam: "Thinking Out Loud"; Minnie & Lily: "Eyes, Nose, Lips"; All: "Leave the Door Open"	Lee Mu-jin; Ive; Charlie Puth; Tori Kelly; Ed Sheeran; Taeyang; Silk Sonic	6 February 2024
141	Jin	BTS	**"Life Goes On"**; **"I'll Be There"**; **"Super Tuna"**; **"Running Wild"**; **"Falling"**	BTS; Jin; Jin; Jin; Jin	19 November 2024
146	2024 Playlist	-	Part 1: Best Solo Performances; Part 2: Best Duets	Various	Part 1: 31 December 2024; Part 2: 1 January 2025
178 (Note: Part of a new project called "Business Lee Mu-jin Service: On The Road Show". Episode taped in front of an audience at the Mimesis Art Museum in Paju.)	Wendy / Choi Yu-ree / Liz / Maki	Red Velvet / - / Ive / &Team	Mu-jin: "Blueming"; Liz: "It's Strange, With You"; Yu-ree: "Popcorn"; Maki: "Golden Hour"; Wendy: "Burst It All"; Yu-ree & Liz: "Square's Dream"; Wendy & Maki: "I Feel Like"; Maki & Liz: "Free"; Yu-ree: **"Shape"**; All: "Into the New World"	IU; OST by Acoustic Collabo for Discovery of Love; D.O.; Jvke; Sunwoo Jung-a; Remake by IU of orig. song "Dream Come True" by W.H.I.T.E; Kwon Jin-ah & Gaeko; OST for KPop Demon Hunters; Choi Yu-ree; Girls' Generation	26 August 2025
234	Lee Mu-jin Autumn Playlist Service	-	Best Songs for Autumn	Various	22 September 2026
Bold denotes own / group song.

== Reception ==
In an episode broadcast on 25 June 2022, Lee Mu-jin appeared as a contestant in Immortal Songs: Singing the Legend, Hwang Chi-yeul praised Lee saying: "He is good at talking and sings well. After one or two broadcasts, when I watch TV at home, I think, I wish I had done that."

== Controversy ==
On March 6, 2025, media reported that Lee Mu-jin was absent for the taping of episode 157 (aired on March 18, 2025) with Nmixx's Kyujin as the guest. Lee Mu-jin is represented by BPM Entertainment, the parent company of One Hundred, which represents EXO's Xiumin. Recently, One Hundred accused KBS of unofficially blocking Xiumin from appearing on shows that feature SM Entertainment artists, following the ChenBaekXi contract dispute. They further claimed that KBS's entertainment director has ignored their requests for two weeks, failing to confirm Xiumin's participation in comeback broadcasts. As a result, Mu-jin was ordered not to attend the taping of his own show, leaving Kyujin to introduce herself and sing alone during the episode. He apologized to the audience on the next episode and in episode 186 he apologized to Kyujin after she returned to the show.

== Awards and nominations ==
Year	Award	Category	Recipient	Result	Ref.
2022	20th KBS Entertainment Awards	Digital Content Award	LeeMujin Service	Won	
2023	21st KBS Entertainment Awards	Best Icon Award	LeeMujin Service	Won	
2024	22nd KBS Entertainment Awards	Popularity Award	LeeMujin Service	Won	
