= Reverie World Tour =

2025-2026 concert tour by Baekhyun

- World tour by Baekhyun
- Associated album: Essence of Reverie
- Start date: June 7, 2025
- End date: January 17, 2026
- Legs: 6
- No. of shows: 40
- Website: inb100.com

Baekhyun concert chronology
- Lonsdaleite Tour (2024); Reverie World Tour (2025)

The Reverie World Tour was the first world tour held by singer Baekhyun to promote his album Essence of Reverie. The tour started in two shows in Seoul from June 7 to 8, 2025 before expanding to the rest of the world.

== Background ==
On April 30, 2025, Baekhyun announced his first tour will start at KSPO Dome in Seoul, South Korea in June before heading to countries in Latin America, North America, Europe, Asia and Oceania.

== Set list ==
Below is the set list for the tour:

Opening VCR

- "Young"
- "Ghost"
- "Pineapple Slice"

MENT

- "Woo"
- "Underwater"
- "Bambi"

VCR

- "Chocolate"
- "Rendez-Vous"
- "Good Morning"

MENT

- "Love Comes Back"
- "Lemonade"
- "UN Village"
- "Truth Be Told"
- "Cold Heart"
- "Psycho"

VCR

- "Black Dreams"
- "Betcha"
- "Candy"
- "Elevator"

ENCORE

- "No Problem"
- "Garden In The Air"

Ending MENT

- "Love Again"
- "You're Different"
- "Amusement Park"

== Tour dates ==
List of 2025 concerts, showing date, city, country, venue, attendance, and gross revenue
Date (2025)	City	Country	Venue	Attendance
June 7	Seoul	South Korea	KSPO Dome	—
June 8	Seoul	South Korea	KSPO Dome	—
June 14	São Paulo	Brazil	Vibra São Paulo	—
June 15	São Paulo	Brazil	Vibra São Paulo	—
June 17	Santiago	Chile	Teatro Caupolicán	—
June 20	Mexico City	Mexico	Pepsi Center WTC	—
June 23	Newark	United States	Prudential Center	—
June 25	Rosemont	United States	Rosemont Theatre	—
June 28	Sugar Land	United States	Smart Financial Centre	—
July 1	Seattle	United States	WaMu Theater	—
July 3	Oakland	United States	Oakland Arena	—
July 6	Los Angeles	United States	Kia Forum	—
July 13	Berlin	Germany	Uber Eats Music Hall	—
July 16	Paris	France	Adidas Arena	—
July 18	Amsterdam	Netherlands	AFAS Live	—
July 20	Milan	Italy	Fabrique Milano	—
July 22	London	England	OVO Arena Wembley	—
August 1	Melbourne	Australia	Festival Hall	—
August 3	Sydney	Australia	Hordern Pavilion	
August 16	Jakarta	Indonesia	ICE BSD	—
August 23	Kuala Lumpur	Malaysia	Idea Live KL	—
August 30	Macau	China	Galaxy Arena	19,000
August 31	Macau	China	Galaxy Arena	19,000
September 7	Bangkok	Thailand	BITEC Live	—
September 8	Bangkok	Thailand	BITEC Live	—
September 13	Tokyo	Japan	Keio Arena Tokyo	—
September 14	Tokyo	Japan	Keio Arena Tokyo	—
September 20	Taipei	Taiwan	NTSU Arena	—
September 21	Taipei	Taiwan	NTSU Arena	—
September 27	Hong Kong	China	AsiaWorld–Arena	—
September 28	Hong Kong	China	AsiaWorld–Arena	—
October 4	Hanoi	Vietnam	Hanoi Indoor Games Gymnasium	—
October 12	Kobe	Japan	Glion Arena Kobe	—
October 13	Kobe	Japan	Glion Arena Kobe	—
October 18	Manila	Philippines	Mall of Asia Arena	—
October 25	Nagoya	Japan	Aichi Sky Expo Hall A	—
October 26	Nagoya	Japan	Aichi Sky Expo Hall A	—
November 1	Singapore		Singapore Indoor Stadium	—

List of 2026 concerts, showing date, city, country, venue, attendance, and gross revenue
Date (2026)	City	Country	Venue	Attendance
January 2	Seoul	South Korea	KSPO Dome	—
January 3	Seoul	South Korea	KSPO Dome	—
January 4	Seoul	South Korea	KSPO Dome	—
January 17	Las Vegas	United States	Dolby Live	—
