= Lonsdaleite Tour =

2024 concert tour by Baekhyun

Baekhyun Asia Tour 'Lonsdaleite'
- Asia tour by Baekhyun
- Promotional poster
- Associated album: City Lights; Delight; Bambi
- Start date: March 16, 2024
- End date: July 28, 2024
- Legs: 3
- No. of shows: 29 total
- Website: inb100.com

Baekhyun concert chronology
- Baekhyun – Light (2021); Lonsdaleite Tour (2024); Reverie World Tour (2025)

Baekhyun Asia Tour 'Lonsdaleite' is the first Asia tour held by singer Baekhyun to promote his EPs City Lights, Delight, and Bambi. The tour started in two shows in Seoul from March 16 to 17, 2024 before travelling to the rest of Asia until its encore concert in Seoul on July 28.

== Background ==
Baekhyun debuted as a member of Exo in 2012 before debuting as a soloist in 2019 through EP City Lights in July. The following year, he released his commercially successful sophomore EP, Delight and became the first soloist to qualify for Triple Platinum certification from the Korea Music Copyright Association (KMCA) after exceeding 750,000 cumulative sales. The EP surpassed 1 million sales by the end of June, making it the first album by a South Korean soloist to achieve this feat in 19 years. He followed up with the release of his third Korean EP Bambi in 2021, shortly before enlisting for his mandatory military service.

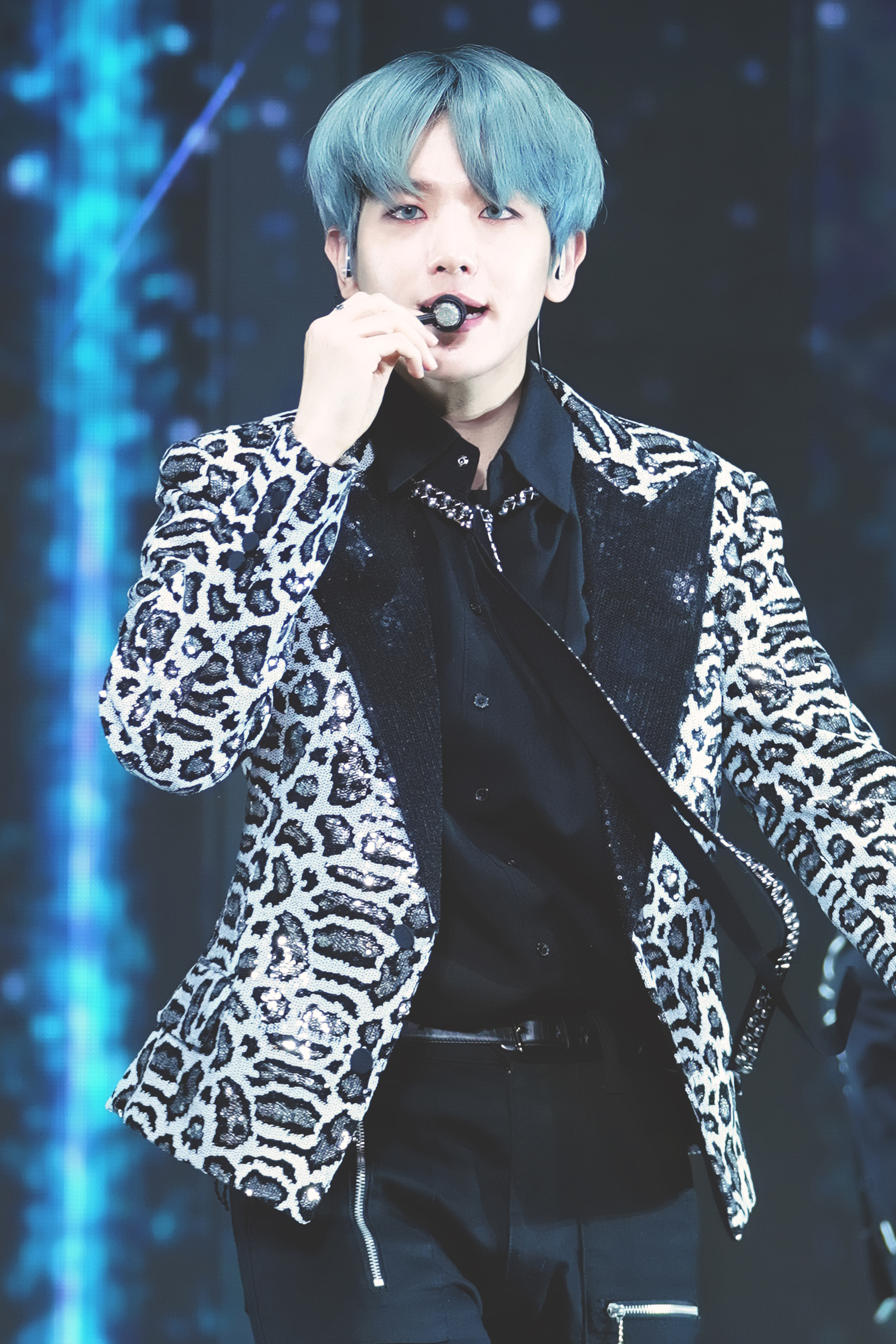
Baekhyun in a SuperM concert in 2020

On June 1, 2023, Baekhyun, alongside bandmates Chen and Xiumin (Exo-CBX) had a contractual dispute with their agency SM Entertainment over their exclusive contracts. The matter was resolved in June 19, with the trio and their agency announcing that they have resolved their differences and promised to solidify their working relationship. Baekhyun returned to Exo for their seventh Korean studio album which was released on July 10.

On August 8, Baekhyun revealed in his Instagram live that he took a loan worth 13 billion won to establish his own music company to pursue a career path as a producer, but he clarified that he will remain an SM artist and a member of Exo.

On January 3, 2024, Ten Asia reported that Baekhyun has established a company called I&B 100 as their CEO and added that the company had been established on June 23, 2023. On January 9, Baekhyun commenced solo activities under INB100 alongside Chen and Xiumin, while Exo activities will remain under SM Entertainment.

On January 22, INB100 announced that Baekhyun will be touring Asia as a soloist for the first time through Lonsdaleite Tour starting with a doubleheader in Seoul's KSPO Dome on March 16 and 17. The name "Lonsdaleite" refers to the type of diamonds that are 58% harder compared to other diamonds.

On June 22, following high demand, INB100 announced encore concert called Lonsdaleite [dot] with two concerts in July 27 and 28 in Seoul's KSPO Dome. During the encore concert, Baekhyun performed unreleased song "Rendez-Vous" and hinted a comeback in September at the end of the show.

On November 27, INB100 partnered with CGV Cinemas to release the screen-to-screen adaption of the encore concert called "Lonsdaleite [dot] in Cinema" featuring the live performance of the concert, exclusive interviews, and behind-the-scenes of the concert itself.

== Tour dates ==
Date (2024)	City	Country	Venue
March 16	Seoul	South Korea	KSPO Dome
March 17	Seoul	South Korea	KSPO Dome
March 23	Tokyo	Japan	Musashinomori Sports Plaza Main Arena
March 24	Tokyo	Japan	Musashinomori Sports Plaza Main Arena
March 28	Singapore		Resorts World Ballroom
April 6	Ho Chi Minh City	Vietnam	Phu Tho Arena
April 7	Ho Chi Minh City	Vietnam	Phu Tho Arena
April 13	Quezon City	Philippines	Araneta Coliseum
April 20	Chiba	Japan	Makuhari Messe
April 21	Chiba	Japan	Makuhari Messe
April 27	Fukuoka	Japan	Fukuoka Convention Center
April 28	Fukuoka	Japan	Fukuoka Convention Center
May 4	Taoyuan	Taiwan	NTSU Arena
May 5	Taoyuan	Taiwan	NTSU Arena
May 10	Kobe	Japan	World Memorial Hall
May 11	Kobe	Japan	World Memorial Hall
May 12	Kobe	Japan	World Memorial Hall
May 16	Sendai	Japan	Sekisui Heim Super Arena
May 17	Sendai	Japan	Sekisui Heim Super Arena
June 1	Tangerang	Indonesia	Indonesia Convention Exhibition
June 2	Tangerang	Indonesia	Indonesia Convention Exhibition
June 8	Hong Kong		AsiaWorld–Expo
June 9	Hong Kong		AsiaWorld–Expo
June 10	Hong Kong		AsiaWorld–Expo
June 15	Bangkok	Thailand	Impact Arena Exhibition Hall 7–8
June 16	Bangkok	Thailand	Impact Arena Exhibition Hall 7–8
June 29	Macau		Galaxy Arena
July 27	Seoul	South Korea	KSPO Dome
July 28	Seoul	South Korea	KSPO Dome

== Set list ==
Lonsdaleite

Opening VCR

- "Diamond"
- "Playboy"
- "Stay Up"
- "Ice Queen"

MENT

- "UN Village"
- "Love Scene"
- "Bungee"
- "Love Again"

MENT

- "Cry for Love"
- "Ghost"
- "Underwater"
- "Bambi"

VCR

- "R U Ridin?'"
- "Betcha"

MENT

- "Candy"

Encore

- "Paranoia"

VCR

- "Garden in the Air"
- "Amusement Park
Ending MENT
Lonsdaleite [dot]

Opening VCR

- "Diamond"
- "Playboy"
- "Stay Up"
- "Ice Queen"

MENT

- "Love Scene"
- "Love Again"
- "Bungee"
- "UN Village"

MENT

- "Rendez-Vous"
- "Ghost"
- "Underwater"
- "Bambi"

VCR

- "R U Ridin?'"
- "Betcha"

MENT

- "Candy"

Encore

- "Paranoia"

VCR

- "Garden in the Air"
- "Amusement Park"
Ending MENT

== Personnel ==
- Artist: Baekhyun
- Tour organizer: INB100, Shownote
