= Amusement Park (Baekhyun song) =

Single by Baekhyun

from the EP Bambi
- Language: Korean
- Released: December 21, 2020
- Recorded: 2020
- Studio: SM Yellow Tail (Seoul)
- Genre: R&B
- Length: 4:17
- Label: SM; Dreamus
- Composers: iHwak; Jeon Byung-sun; Hong Young-in; Saimon
- Lyricists: iHwak; Jeon Byung-sun; Hong Young-in
- Producers: Royal Dive; Saimon

Baekhyun singles chronology
"Candy" (2020)	"Amusement Park" (2020)	"Get You Alone" (2021)

Music video
- "Amusement Park" on YouTube

"Amusement Park" (Korean: 놀이공원; RR: norigongwon) is a song recorded by South Korean singer Baekhyun. It was released on December 21, 2020, by SM Entertainment and distributed by Dreamus, as the pre-release single of his third EP, Bambi.

The song is Baekhyun's fourth and final release of 2020, following "My Love", "On the Road", and "Candy".

== Background ==
On May 25, 2020, Baekhyun released his commercially successful sophomore EP, Delight which surpassed over 730,000 pre-ordered copies, a day before its release. He became the first soloist to qualify for Triple Platinum certification from the Korea Music Copyright Association (KMCA) after exceeding 750,000 cumulative sales. Delight surpassed 1 million sales by the end of June, making it the first album by a South Korean soloist to achieve this feat since Kim Gun-mo's Another Day which was released 19 years prior.

On December 17, SM Entertainment announced that Baekhyun will release a new single called "Amusement Park" which will be released digitally on December 21, as the special year-end gift for the fans. On December 20, SM uploaded a live teaser video to showcase the song before the release on their YouTube and Naver TV channels.

The song released digitally through various music streaming service on December 21 at 6 PM KST in tandem with its live music video.

== Composition ==
"Amusement Park" is described as medium-tempo R&B song with mellow piano and guitar melodies. It was co-composed by production team Royal Dive, Saimon, and iHwak in the key of F major with the tempo of 85 beats per minute.

The lyrics were penned by Royal Dive and iHwak as it gently expresses the feelings for a loved one by comparing it to the colorful scenery of an amusement park. Speaking of the lyrics, Baekhyun stated "It makes you feel like you're really in an amusement park, which deepens your immersion." He also added that the listeners can listen to the song any time and they will feel as if they were on a date.

== Commercial performance ==
Domestically, "Amusement Park" peaked at the No. 44 of Gaon Music Chart for the 52nd week of 2020. The song peaked at No. 78 in the K-pop Hot 100 chart where it stayed for a week.

In the United States, the song reached and peaked at No. 10 in the World Digital Song Sales chart.

== Live performances ==
On the day of the song's release, SM announced that Baekhyun will hold his first online concert on V Live called "Baekhyun – Light" on January 3, 2021, with the tickets on sale starting on December 24.

"Amusement Park" was included on the online concert's set list. The song was later featured on the set list of his first solo Asia concert, Lonsdaleite Tour in 2024.

== Cover ==
DK, a member of boy band Seventeen, released a cover of the song in celebration of his 26th birthday on February 18, 2023.

== Charts ==
Chart performance for "Amusement Park"
Chart (2020)	Peak position
Hong Kong (HKRIA)	22
South Korea (Gaon)	44
South Korea K-pop Hot 100 (Billboard)	78
US World Digital Song Sales (Billboard)	10

== Credits and personnel ==
Credits adapted from the EP's liner notes.

Studio

- SM Yellow Tail Studio – recording, digital editing, engineered for mix
- MonoTree Studio – engineered for mix
- Klang Studio – mixing
- 821 Sound Mastering – mastering

Personnel

- SM Entertainment – executive producer
- Lee Soo-man – producer
- Yoo Young-jin – music and sound supervisor
- Royal Dive – producer, lyrics, composition, arrangement
- Saimon – producer, composition, arrangement
- iHwak – lyricist, composition
- Byun Baek-hyun – vocals
- Cho Seong-hak – background vocals
- Noh Min-ji – recording, engineered for mix
- Kang Seon-young – engineered for mix
- Koo Jong-pil – mixing
- Hong Young-in – bass
- Lee Seol-min – guitar
- Jin Byeong-shin – piano
- Kwon Nam-woo – mastering

== Release history ==
Release history for "Amusement Park"
Region	Date	Format	Label
South Korea	December, 21, 2020	Digital download; streaming	SM; Dreamus
Various	December, 21, 2020	Digital download; streaming	SM
