= Baekhyun =

South Korean singer (born 1992)

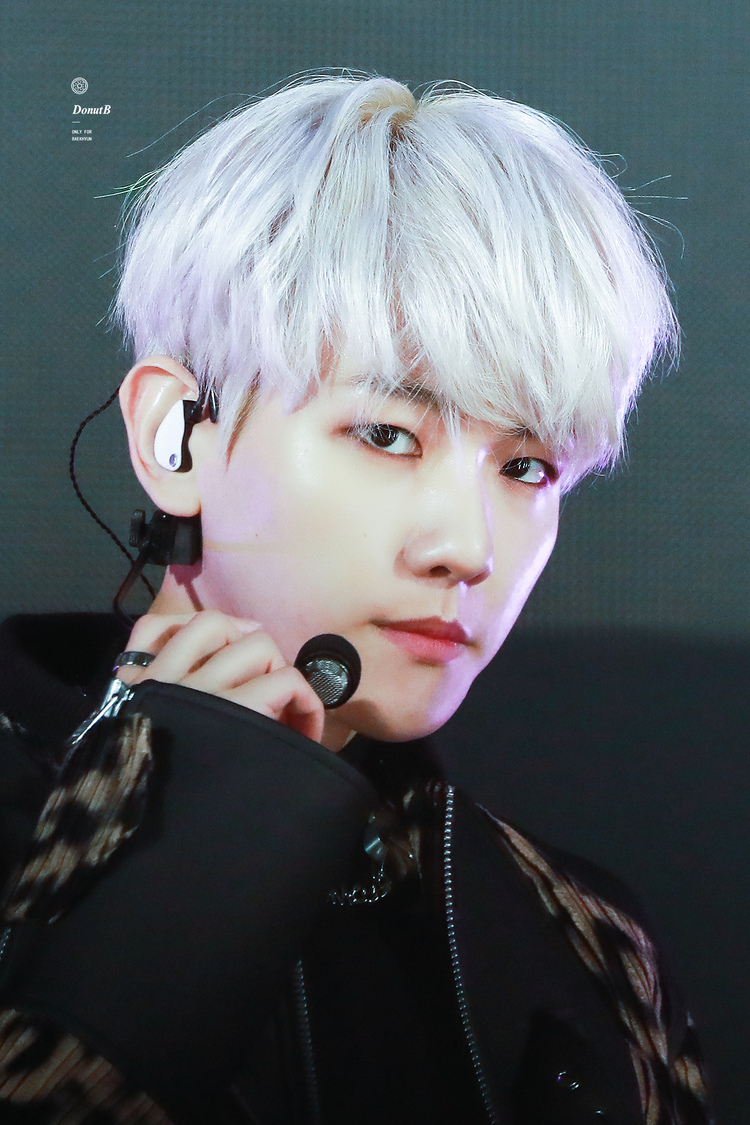
- Baekhyun in February 2020
- Born: Byun Baek-hyun; May 6, 1992 (age 34); Bucheon, South Korea
- Education: Kyung Hee Cyber University
- Occupations: Singer; actor
- Musical career
- Genres: Pop; R&B
- Instrument: Vocals
- Years active: 2012–present
- Labels: SM; INB100 (Note: Official English name of I&B100.)
- Member of: Exo; Exo-K; Exo-CBX; SM Town; SuperM
- Website: inb100.com/40

Korean name
- Hangul: 변백현
- RR: Byeon Baekhyeon
- MR: Pyŏn Paekhyŏn

Byun Baek-hyun (Korean: 변백현; born May 6, 1992), known mononymously as Baekhyun, is a South Korean singer and actor. He is a member of the South Korean-Chinese boy band Exo, its subgroup Exo-K and its subunit Exo-CBX. In 2019, Baekhyun became a leader of the supergroup SuperM.

Following the release of several albums and extended plays with Exo, Baekhyun began pursuing a solo career in 2019 by releasing his debut extended play, City Lights, which sold more than half-a-million copies in 2019 and is the best-selling album by a solo artist of the 2010s in South Korea. City Lights was followed by two million-selling EPs, Delight (2020), the first album by a solo artist in South Korea to have sold over 1 million copies in 19 years, and Bambi (2021). He has been labeled as the "Genius Idol", and won three consecutive Mnet Asian Music Awards for Best Male Artist from 2019 to 2021.

== Early life ==
Baekhyun was born on May 6, 1992, in Bucheon, Gyeonggi Province, South Korea. He has a brother named Baek-beom who is seven years older than him. Baekhyun began training to be a singer when he was 11 years old, influenced by South Korean singer Rain. He attended Jungwon High School in Bucheon, where he was the lead singer in a band called Honsusangtae (lit. "coma") and won a local music festival. He received piano lessons from Kim Hyun-woo, member of South Korean rock band DickPunks. In addition to musical activities, Baekhyun trained as a martial artist in his youth and has a dan 3 black belt in Hapkido.

Baekhyun was spotted by an SM Entertainment agent while he was studying for the entrance exams to the Seoul Institute of the Arts. He later joined SM Entertainment in 2011 through the S.M. Casting System.

== Career ==
=== 2012–15: Debut and career beginnings ===
Baekhyun was officially revealed to be Exo's ninth member on January 30, 2012, as the vocalist of Exo. The group officially debuted in April 2012 and has since gained significant popularity and commercial success.

In February 2014, Baekhyun and fellow Exo member Suho became regular hosts for the SBS music television show Inkigayo. They left the position in November 2014 to focus on Exo's upcoming comeback. In July 2014, Baekhyun made his musical theatre debut, playing the main role of Don Lockwood in the South Korean production of the musical Singin' in the Rain by SM C&C.

In April 2015, Baekhyun released his first solo song since debut titled "Beautiful" as the soundtrack for Exo's web-drama Exo Next Door. The song became the first soundtrack single from a web drama to top digital charts. In May 2015, Baekhyun was announced to be starring in action film Dokgo alongside actor Yeo Jin-goo. However, production of the film was announced to have been cancelled in January 2016. In December 2015, Baekhyun paid tribute to the late South Korean singer Kim Hyun-sik by performing his song "Like Rain Like Music" at SBS' year-end music program Gayo Daejeon. The studio recording of his rendition was later released digitally.

=== 2016–2018: Acting roles and Exo-CBX ===
In January 2016, Baekhyun and Miss A member Suzy released a duet titled "Dream". The song quickly reached the top on online real-time music charts and later debuted at number one on Gaon's weekly digital chart. "Dream" also won first place five times in total on music television programs Music Bank and Inkigayo. In April 2016, Baekhyun received a YinYueTai V-Chart Award for Most Popular Singer in South Korea. In May 2016, Baekhyun and South Korean singer K.Will released a folk-ballad duet titled "The Day" as part of SM Entertainment's music project SM Station.

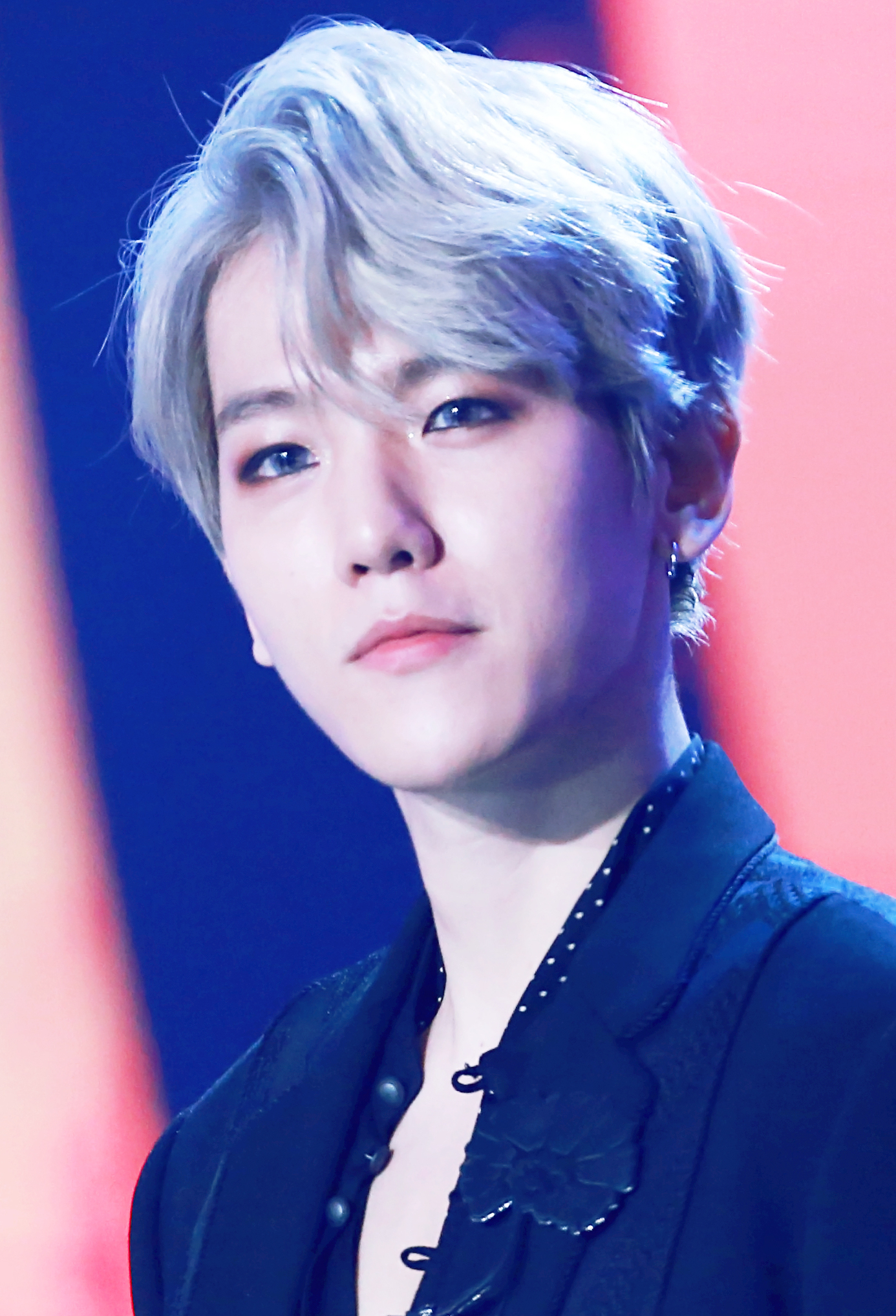
Baekhyun at the Melon Music Awards, December 2017

In August 2016, Baekhyun made his small screen debut in the SBS historical drama Moon Lovers: Scarlet Heart Ryeo, a South Korean adaptation of the Chinese novel Bu Bu Jing Xin. For his performance in the drama he received a New Star Award at the 2016 SBS Drama Awards. He also collaborated with fellow Exo members Chen and Xiumin on an original soundtrack for the series titled "For You". In October 2016, together with Chen and Xiumin, Baekhyun became a member of Exo's first official sub unit Exo-CBX. Their debut extended play, Hey Mama!, was released on October 31. In November 2016, Baekhyun began participating in SM Entertainment's League of Legends tournament "2016 S.M. Super Celeb League", where he and labelmate Heechul played the game with both professional players and fans from South Korea and China.

In February 2017, Baekhyun and Sistar member Soyou released a duet titled "Rain". The song reached number one on every South Korean online music chart, an achievement known as "all-kill", making him the first SM Entertainment artist to achieve "all-kill" in both 2016 and 2017 with "Dream" and "Rain" respectively. In April 2017, Baekhyun released a single titled "Take You Home" for the second season of the Station project. The song peaked at number twelve on Gaon's weekly digital chart.

On February 5, 2018, Baekhyun performed the South Korean national anthem at the opening ceremony of the 132nd International Olympic Committee (IOC) session in front of Moon Jae-in, the president of South Korea, and Lee Hee-beom, the president of the Organizing Committee for the 2018 Winter Olympics. In August 2018, Baekhyun and rapper Loco released a collaboration track titled "Young" for the Station project. The song charted at number four on the Billboard World Digital Song Sales chart.

=== 2019–2022: Solo debut, SuperM, and enlistment ===
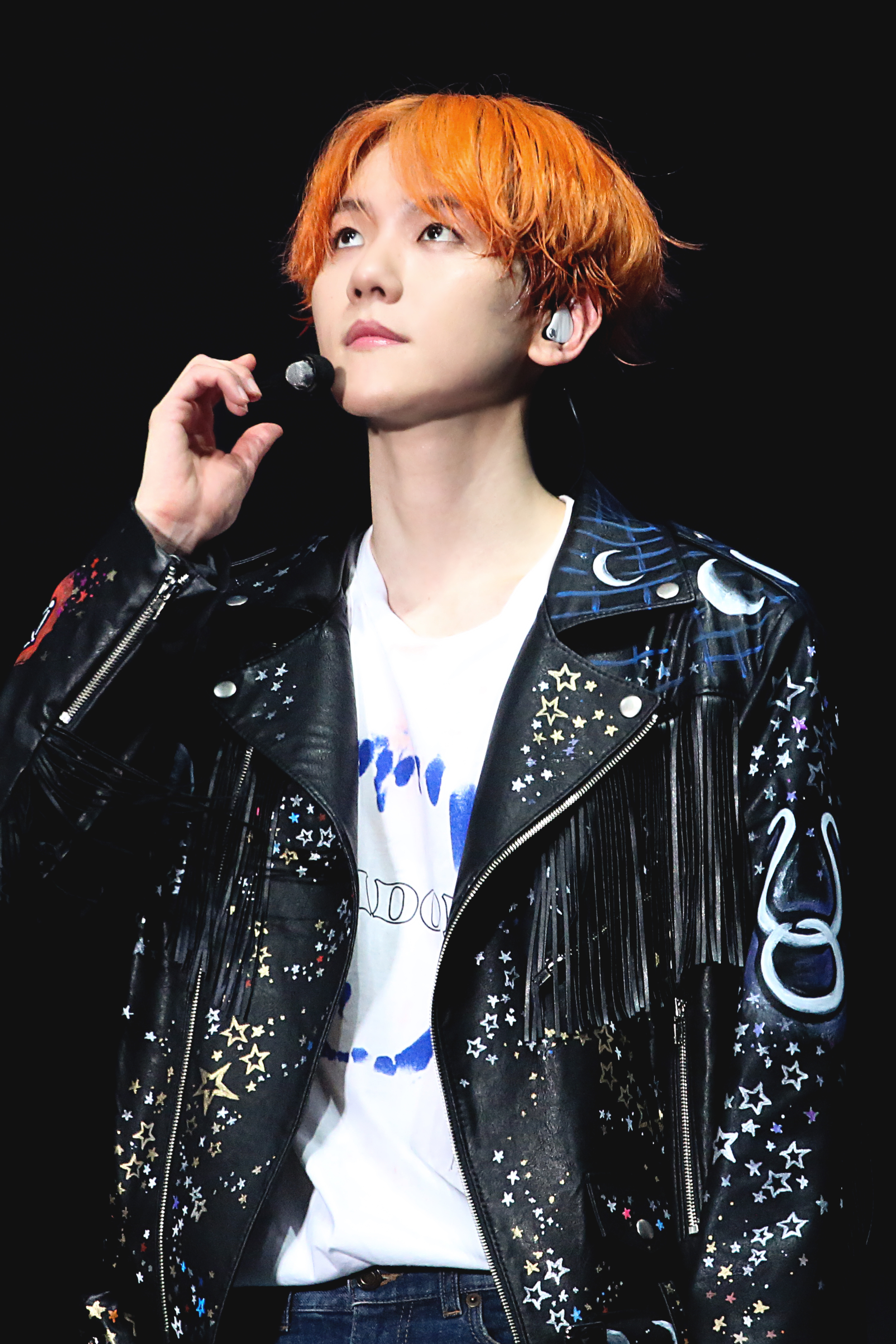
Baekhyun at the Exo Planet 5 - Exploration, July 2019

In July 2019, Baekhyun debuted as a solo artist, the third soloist among Exo members, by releasing the EP City Lights. The EP went on to sell over 550,000 copies in 2019, breaking the record for the best-selling album by a solo artist in the history of South Korea's Gaon Music Chart. It topped the Gaon weekly and monthly chart and placed sixth on the year-end chart, as well as first among albums released by solo artists. It eventually became the best-selling solo album of South Korea in the 2010s. In August, Baekhyun was confirmed as a member of SuperM, a "K-pop supergroup" created by SM Entertainment in collaboration with Capitol Records that would be aimed at the American market. SuperM debuted with a self-titled EP and began promotions in October. In December, Baekhyun was awarded Best Male Artist at the 2019 Mnet Asian Music Awards following the success of his debut EP City Lights, and its lead single "UN Village".

Early in 2020, Baekhyun released two soundtrack singles, "My Love" and "On the Road", for the television series Dr. Romantic 2 and Hyena respectively. In May, Baekhyun collaborated with Bolbbalgan4, featuring on her single "Leo". The song peaked at number two on Gaon's weekly digital chart. In the same month, Baekhyun released his second EP Delight, featuring the lead single "Candy". The EP garnered over 732,000 pre-orders, making it the most pre-ordered album by a soloist in South Korean history. By July, Delight had sold more than 1,000,000 copies, becoming the first album by a solo artist in South Korea to do so since Another Days (2001) by Kim Gun-mo. Also in July, Baekhyun released a remake of BoA's track "Garden in the Air" from her album Girls on Top (2005) through SM Station as the first release from a project dedicated to BoA's 20th debut anniversary. Later in 2020, he released two more soundtrack singles, "Every Second" for Record of Youth, and "Happy" for Do You Like Brahms?. On December 6, Baekhyun won the Mnet Asian Music Award for Best Male Artist for a second consecutive year. Later in December, he released a digital single titled "Amusement Park".

On January 3, 2021, Baekhyun held his first solo concert, Baekhyun: Light, in a digital format as in-person concerts were not possible due to restrictions related to the COVID-19 pandemic. Broadcast through Beyond Live, the concert drew 110,000 viewers from 120 countries. A day later, he released "Get You Alone," the lead single from his self-titled debut Japanese EP, which was released on January 21. The EP has been certified Gold by the Recording Industry Association of Japan. On March 30, Baekhyun released his third Korean-language EP (fourth overall) Bambi and its lead single of the same name, his last release before enlisting for South Korea's mandatory military service. The album replaced Delight as the most pre-ordered album by a solo artist in South Korea at over 833,000 copies. It debuted atop the Gaon Album Chart and is Baekyun's second consecutive Korean-language album to have sold over one million copies. In December, he won his third consecutive Mnet Asian Music Award for Best Male Artist.

=== 2023–present: Contract dispute and INB100 ===
In June 2023, it was announced that Baekhyun, Chen and Xiumin had ended their contracts with SM Entertainment on the grounds of overdue payment and unreasonable deals. On June 3, Ten Asia announced that Baekhyun has established his own company called "I&B100" and founded it on June 23 of last year before the issue of renewal contracts with SM was raised. Baekhyun will continue to work "separately and together" with SM through his own label during the contract renewal period. On June 19, SM and the three members announced that both parties had resolved their differences over contract dispute and the members had decided to stay with the agency.

On October 23, 2023, Baekhyun performed as Ezreal in a virtual boyband unveiled by esports publisher Riot Games alongside ØZI, Tobi Lou and Cal Scruby named "Heartsteel", with the group releasing their debut song, "Paranoia".

On January 8, 2024, Baekhyun officially began his solo activities under his own label, INB100, along with fellow Exo members Xiumin and Chen while Exo activities remains under SM Entertainment. In January 2024, INB100 announced that Baekhyun would embark on a concert tour, titled Lonsdaleite, traveling throughout Asia, starting from Seoul on March 16, 2024.

On July 28, 2024, Baekhyun announced that he would make his comeback in September 2024 during his encore concert "Lonsdaleite[dot]". A world tour Reverie is scheduled for 2025.

== Voice ==
Baekhyun's tenor voice, described as "soaring" by Refinery29 and "standout" by Billboard, has been one of the focal points of his discography.

== Other ventures ==
=== Fashion and endorsements ===
In May 2017, Baekhyun collaborated with Montblanc for the brand's digital watch and released the advertisement video on social media. In May 2018, Vogue magazine revealed that Baekhyun collaborated with Privé, and would be launching his own brand, "Privé by BBH", a unisex street-wear brand, on July 1. Baekhyun is now the co-creative director of the brand. In an interview with Forbes, Baekhyun explained that he wants to "encourage people to embody being fearless" when they wear clothes from his brand.

In September 2020, Baekhyun was announced as the brand ambassador of Burberry. He was featured on the cover of Harper's Bazaar Korea October issue, making him the first K-Pop male artist to be featured solo on the magazine's cover. Baekhyun has also been named brand ambassador for the beauty brands TirTir and health food brand Life Pharm.

=== Philanthropy ===
In September 2024, INB100 announced that Baekhyun donated ₩50 million (equivalent to ₩52.25 million or US$38,982.32 in 2025) in January to the Friends of the National Museum of Korea to support the recovery of Korean artifacts currently overseas, following his attendance at the organization's 50th-anniversary ceremony.

== Personal life ==
=== Education ===
Along with fellow Exo members Chanyeol and Suho, Baekhyun attended Kyung Hee Cyber University and took online classes for Culture and Arts Department of Business Administration.

=== Military service ===
On May 6, 2021, Baekhyun enlisted in South Korea's mandatory military service. Having been diagnosed with hypothyroidism, he served as a public service worker instead of an active-duty soldier, and was discharged on February 5, 2023. The following day, he held a live broadcast on YouTube to greet his fans.

== Discography ==
Extended plays

- City Lights (2019)
- Delight (2020)
- Baekhyun (2021)
- Bambi (2021)
- Hello, World (2024)
- Essence of Reverie (2025)

== Tours and concerts ==
Main tours

- Baekhyun Asia Tour Lonsdaleite (2024)
- Reverie World Tour (2025)

Online concerts

- Baekhyun – Light (2021)

Online affiliated concerts

- SM Town Live Culture Humanity (2021)

== Filmography ==
=== Television series ===
Year	Title	Role	Notes	Ref.
2012	To the Beautiful You	Himself	Cameo; episode 2	
2015	Exo Next Door	Himself		
2016	Moon Lovers: Scarlet Heart Ryeo	Wang Eun		

=== Television shows ===
Year	Title	Role	Ref.
2014	Inkigayo	Co-host	
2017	Master Key	Recurring cast	
2019	Five Cranky Brothers	Main cast (pilot)	

== Theatre ==
Year	Title	Role	Ref.
2014	Singin' in the Rain	Don Lockwood	
