= Bambi (Baekhyun song) =

- Remixes cover

Single by Baekhyun

from the EP Bambi
- Language: Korean
- Released: March 30, 2021
- Recorded: 2021
- Studio: SM Yellow Tail (Seoul)
- Genre: R&B
- Length: 3:33
- Label: SM; Dreamus; ScreaM
- Composers: Deez (Soultriii); Yunsu (Soultriii); Saay (Soultriii); Adrian McKinnon
- Lyricists: Deez; Saay
- Producers: Deez; Saay

Baekhyun singles chronology
"Doll" (2021)	"Bambi" (2021)	"Hurt" (2021)

Music video
- "Bambi" on YouTube

"Bambi" is a song recorded by South Korean singer Baekhyun. It was released on March 30, 2021, by SM Entertainment and distributed by Dreamus, as the lead single of his third EP of the same name.

== Background ==
Baekhyun began the year of 2021 with the release of "Get You Alone", the lead single for his eponymous Japanese EP and debuted the song during his first online concert on January 4 in front of 110,000 fans worldwide. The EP was released on January 20.

On February 1, Baekhyun collaborated with labelmate Raiden and Changmo for, "Runner", a theme song that was released for T1 esports team that were competing in the League of Legends.

On March 4, SM announced that Baekhyun will make a solo comeback at the end of the month and was reported in the process of finalizing the album. Eight days later, he collaborated with labelmate Doyoung from NCT for the cover of "Doll", originally performed by Lee Jee-hee and Shin Hye-sung. The comeback schedule poster was uploaded in social media on March 15 and the date of the EP's release was scheduled on March 30.

On March 17, "Bambi" was officially announced as the title track for the EP. Baekhyun held an impromptu live broadcast on March 19, where he introduced "Bambi" as "the 30 years old Baekhyun" and hinted that the song has foreign feel and leans toward pop. The teaser for the music video was released on March 25 at SM Town's YouTube and Naver TV channels.

"Bambi" was released digitally alongside its accompanying music video and the full EP on March 30. The remix versions of the song by BRLLNT and h4rdy were released digitally as part of iScreaM Vol.8 : Bambi Remixes on April 23.

== Composition ==
"Bambi" is a "groovy" R&B song featuring emotional guitar melody that was co-composed by Deez, Yunsu, Saay, and Adrian McKinnon. The song was composed in the key of G minor with the tempo of 61 beats per minute.

The lyrics were penned by Deez and Saay, depicting fairy-tale like settings and touched mature love themes.

During the press conference led by bandmate Xiumin, Baekhyun considered "Bambi" as his custom song and recalled his liking of the song after hearing it for the first time because the hook was very strong. He added that the song likens the transition from a boy to a young man and recounted, "I thought a lot about what could give me extreme sexiness while relaxing a little."

== Music video ==
The music video begins with Baekhyun moving through a dark train and danced to the choreography of the song before switching to a suit and a fedora. Baekhyun revealed in an interview that he was actively involved in the production of the music video.

== Commercial performance ==
In its home country, "Bambi" peaked at the No. 14 of Gaon Music Chart for the 14th week of 2021. The song peaked at No. 36 in the K-pop Hot 100 chart where it stayed for a week.

In the United States, the song reached and peaked at No. 10 in the World Digital Song Sales chart.

== Live performances ==
Prior to the release of Bambi, Baekhyun announced that he would not promote new material in any music shows and that nothing has been scheduled in April in preparations for his mandatory military service on May 6.

The song would only be performed live for the first time three years later in 2024 as part of the set list for Baekhyun's first solo Asia concert Lonsdaleite Tour.

== Track listing ==
- Remixes
1. "Bambi (BRLLNT remix)" – 2:51
2. "Bambi (h4rdy remix)" – 4:04

== Charts ==
Chart performance for "Bambi"
Chart (2021)	Peak position
Hungary (Single Top 40)	18
South Korea (Circle)	14
South Korea (K-pop Hot 100)	36
US World Digital Song Sales (Billboard)	10

== Credits and personnel ==
Credits adapted from the album's liner notes.

Studio

- SM Yellow Tail Studio – recording, digital editing, engineered for mix
- SM Blue Ocean Studio – mixing
- 821 Sound Mastering – mastering

Personnel

- SM Entertainment – executive producer
- Lee Soo-man – producer
- Yoo Young-jin – music and sound supervisor
- Soultriii – composition, lyrics
  - Deez – producer, lyrics, composition, arrangement, vocal direction, digital audio editing, programming, background vocals, guitar, synthesizer
  - Saay – producer, lyrics, composition, background vocals
  - Yunsu – lyrics, composition, arrangement, guitar
- Adrian McKinnon – composition
- Byun Baek-hyun – vocals
- Noh Min-ji – recording, digital audio editing, engineered for mix
- Kim Chul-soon – mixing
- Lee Sang-hyeon – producer, arrangement (remix)
- h4rdy – producer, arrangement (remix)
- Kwon Nam-woo – mastering

== Release history ==
Release history for "Bambi"
Region	Date	Format	Version	Label
South Korea	March 30, 2021	Digital download; streaming	Original	SM; Dreamus
Various	March 30, 2021	Digital download; streaming	Original	SM
Various	April 23, 2021	Digital download; streaming	Remixes	SM; ScreaM; Dreamus
