= Jang Pill Soon =

South Korean folk-rock musician

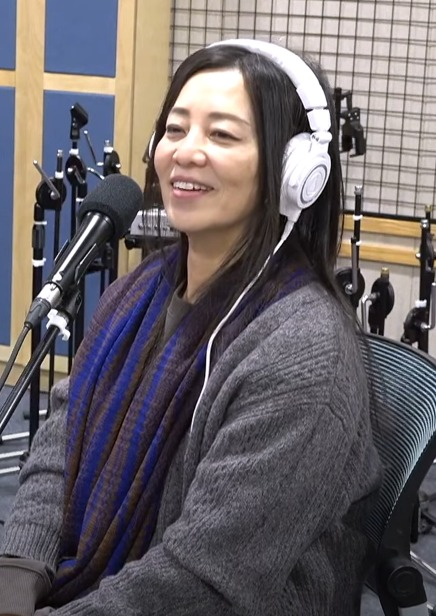
- Jang Pill Soon in 2023

Background information
- Born: 22 May 1963 (age 62)
- Origin: Seoul, South Korea
- Genres: Folk rock, indie pop
- Years active: 1984–present
- Labels: Pooreungompangee

Jang Pill Soon (Korean: 장필순; born 22 May 1963) is a South Korean folk rock musician. She has released nine studio albums: 어느새 (1989), 외로운 사랑(1991), 이 도시는 언제나 외로워 (1992), 하루 (1995), 나의 외로움이 널 부를 때 (1997), SOONY 6 (2002), SOONY SEVEN (2013), Soony Eight (2018) and Petrichor-Jang Pillsoon (2021).

== Career ==
Jang was born in Seoul. She first worked in campus folk circles in the early 1980s, performing in the creative-music collective Sunlight Village (Haetbitchon) and later in the duo Sori-Duo-ul before moving into professional session and backing-vocal work.

Jang’s solo debut album 어느새 (Eoneusae) was released in 1989. She has collaborated with musicians such as Cho Dongjin and Cho Dongik. Her fifth studio album, 나의 외로움이 널 부를 때, released in 1997, was critically acclaimed, and she was considered a representative of modern folk rock in the 90s. Her sixth album, Soony 6, was released in 2002.

In 2013, she released her seventh studio album, Soony Seven, and was nominated for five awards in the Korean Music Awards. Her eighth album, Soony Eight, released in 2018, won the album of the year at the Korean Music Awards, and music critic Seo Jeongningap described it as "a masterpiece infused by Jeju Island into the life of a musician who has been doing music for 30 years." She released her ninth studio album Petrichor-Jang Pillsoon in 2021.

== Personal life ==
Jang has moved to Jeju Island since July 2005. In 2018, she married musician Cho Dongik.

== Discography ==
=== Studio albums ===
- 어느새 (1989)
- 외로운 사랑 (1991)
- 이 도시는 언제나 외로워 (1992)
- 하루 (1995)
- 나의 외로움이 널 부를 때 (1997)
- Soony 6 (2002)
- Soony Seven (2013)
- Soony Eight (2018)
- Petrichor-Jang Pillsoon (2021)
