= My Love (Baekhyun song) =

Single by Baekhyun

from the album Dr. Romantic 2 OST
- Released: January 7, 2020
- Length: 3:15
- Label: YAMYAM Entertainment; Kakao M
- Composers: Choi In-hwan; Lee Seung-joo
- Lyricists: Ji Hoon; Jeon Chang-yeop
- Producers: Choi In-hwan; Lee Seung-joo

Baekhyun singles chronology
"UN Village" (2019)	"My Love" (2020)	"On the Road" (2020)

"My Love" (너를 사랑하고 있어; Neoreul saranghago isseo) is a song recorded by South Korean singer Baekhyun for the soundtrack of the 2020 drama series Dr. Romantic 2. It was released as a digital single on January 7, 2020, by YAMYAM Entertainment, under license by Kakao M.

== Chart performance ==
"My Love" debuted at number seventeen on South Korea's Gaon Digital Chart for the chart issue dated January 5–11, 2020 rising and reaching number fifteen on the following week, becoming the singer's eighth top 15 single on the chart. The song also reached the twenty-ninth position on the Billboard K-Pop Hot 100.

== Track listing ==
No.	Title	Lyrics	Music	Length
1.	"My Love" (너를 사랑하고 있어; Neoreul saranghago isseo)	Ji Hoon; Jeon Chang-yeop	Choi In-hwan; Lee Seung-joo	3:15
2.	"My Love" (instrumental)		Choi In-hwan; Lee Seung-joo	3:15
Total length:				6:30

== Charts ==
=== Weekly charts ===
Chart (2020)	Peak position
South Korea (Gaon)	15
South Korea (K-pop Hot 100)	13
US World Digital Songs (Billboard)	20

=== Monthly charts ===
Chart (2020)	Peak position
South Korea (Gaon)	23

=== Year-end charts ===
Chart (2020)	Position
South Korea (Gaon)	50

== Awards and nominations ==
Year	Award	Category
2020	6th APAN Awards	Best OST

== Release history ==
Region	Date	Format	Label
South Korea	January 7, 2020	Digital download; streaming	YAMYAM Entertainment; Kakao M
Various	January 7, 2020	Digital download; streaming	YAM YAM Entertainment
