= Bambi (EP) =

- Digital cover

EP by Baekhyun
- Released: March 30, 2021
- Recorded: 2021
- Studios: Doobdoob (Seoul); Klang (Seoul); SM Big Shot (Seoul); SM Blue Cup (Seoul); SM Blue Ocean (Seoul); SM Concert Hall (Seoul); SM LVYIN (Seoul); SM Yellow Tail (Seoul)
- Genre: R&B
- Length: 22:03
- Language: Korean
- Labels: SM; Dreamus
- Producer: Lee Soo-man

Baekhyun chronology
Baekhyun (2021)	Bambi (2021)	Hello, World! (2024)

Singles from Bambi
- 1. "Amusement Park" Released: December 21, 2020; 2. "Bambi" Released: March 30, 2021

Bambi is the third Korean-language extended play (fourth overall) by South Korean singer Baekhyun. It was released on March 30, 2021, by SM Entertainment and contains six tracks, including the single "Amusement Park", released on December 21, 2020, and the lead single of the same name.

On April 20, 2021, it was announced that a remix version of "Bambi" would be released on April 23 as a single titled, iScreaM Vol.8 : Bambi Remixes, working by DJ and producer BRLLNT and h4rdy.

== Background ==
Bambi was announced on March 4, 2021, as Baekhyun's final release before his mandatory military service. SM Entertainment began releasing teasers and a mood-sampler video on March 10 through Exo's official social media accounts.

The album and its title track's music video were released on March 30 at 6PM KST both digitally and physically.

== Promotion ==
An hour before the music video and album's release, Baekhyun appeared on a live broadcast through the Naver app V Live, where he promoted and discussed the album. On April 9, Baekhyun won his first Music Bank trophy with "Bambi". Contrary to his previous album releases, Baekhyun did not attend or perform on any Korean music show, citing his service obligations as the reason.

== Commercial performance ==
On March 30, hours before the album's release, Korean news media reported that pre-orders had surpassed 833,392 copies, making Bambi the most pre-ordered album by a soloist in South Korean history. The record was previously held by Baekhyun's second mini album Delight (2020). Bambi debuted at number one on the week 14 issue of the Gaon Album Chart for the period March 28–April 3, 2021 giving Baekhyun his third domestic chart-topper. With only two days of availability, the album sold a total of 591,944 copies and topped the monthly chart for March. On April 19, it was announced that the album had surpassed 1 million copies sold, making it Baekhyun's second to reach this milestone after Delight.

Internationally, the album debuted at number 15 on Billboard's World Albums chart in the United States, giving Baekhyun his third entry on the World ranking.

== Track listing ==
Bambi track listing
No.	Title	Lyrics	Music	Arrangement	Length
1.	"Love Scene"	Colde (WAVY)	Colde (WAVY); Stally (WAVY)	WAVY	3:37
2.	"Bambi"	Deez (Soultriii); Saay (Soultriii)	Deez (Soultriii); Yunsu (Soultriii); Saay (Soultriii); Adrian McKinnon	Soultriii	3:33
3.	"All I Got"	Kenzie	Tone Stith	Tone Stith	4:00
4.	"Amusement Park" (놀이공원; Norigongwon)	iHwak; Jeon Byung-sun (Royal Dive) (Joombas); Hong Young-in (Royal Dive) (Joombas)	iHwak; Jeon Byung-sun (Royal Dive) (Joombas); Hong Young-in (Royal Dive) (Joombas); $aimon	iHwak; Royal Dive (Joombas)	4:17
5.	"Privacy"	Jane (Channel 23)	Junny (Mauve Company); Aisle (Channel 23); Zayson; Brian Cho; Emoji (3rdflr); Jane (Channel 23)	Brian Cho; Zayson	3:07
6.	"Cry for Love"	Kenzie	Stephan Benson (Misunderstood); Greg Bonnick; Hayden Chapman	LDN Noise	3:31
Total length:					22:03

== Charts ==
=== Weekly charts ===
Weekly chart performance for Bambi
Chart (2021)	Peak position
Japanese Albums (Oricon)	8
South Korean Albums (Gaon)	1
UK Album Downloads (Official Charts)	34
US World Albums (Billboard)	15

=== Year-end charts ===
Year-end chart performance for Bambi
Chart (2021)	Position
South Korean Albums (Gaon)	12

== Certifications and sales ==
Certifications for Bambi
Region	Certification	Certified units/sales
South Korea (KMCA)	Million	1,007,625

== Year-end lists ==
Bambi on year-end lists
Critic/Publication	List	Rank	Ref.
PopMatters	Top 20 Best K-pop Albums of 2021	18	

== Release history ==
Release history for Bambi
Region	Date	Format	Label	Ref.
South Korea	March 30, 2021	CD	SM; Dreamus	
Various	March 30, 2021	Digital download; streaming	SM	

== See also ==
- List of best-selling albums in South Korea
- List of K-pop songs on the Billboard charts
- List of K-pop albums on the Billboard charts
- List of Gaon Album Chart number ones of 2021
