= On the Road (Baekhyun song) =

Single by Baekhyun

from the album Hyena OST
- Released: February 29, 2020
- Length: 3:58
- Label: Danal Entertainment
- Songwriters: Rhinoceros; Kangaroo; Red Bear
- Producers: Red Bear; Jin Hee Ju

Baekhyun singles chronology
"My Love" (2020)	"On the Road" (2020)	"Candy" (2020)

Music video
- "On the Road" on YouTube

"On the Road" (Korean: 너에게 가는 이 길 위에서 (너.이.길); neoege ganeun i gil wieseo (neo.i.gil)) is a song recorded by South Korean singer Baekhyun for the soundtrack of the 2020 television series Hyena. It was released as a digital single on February 29, 2020, by Danal Entertainment.

== Lyrics ==
The track is a tender ballad along with piano about hoping a special someone can understand your sincere feelings for them.

== Chart performance ==
"On the Road" debuted at number 130 on South Korea's Gaon Digital Chart for the chart issue dated February 23–29, 2020 rising and reaching number seventy-six on the following week.

== Track listing ==
No.	Title	Lyrics	Music	Length
1.	"On the Road" (너에게 가는 이 길 위에서 (너.이.길))	Rhinoceros; Kangaroo; Red Bear; Jin Hee Ju	Red Bear; Jin Hee Ju	3:58
2.	"On the Road" (너에게 가는 이 길 위에서 (너.이.길) (instrumental))		Red Bear; Jin Hee Ju	3:55
Total length:				7:13

== Charts ==
Chart (2020)	Peak position
South Korea (Gaon)	76
South Korea (K-pop Hot 100)	45
