= Baekhyun (EP) =

- Digital and Get you alone version cover

EP by Baekhyun
- Released: January 20, 2021
- Studios: Doobdoob (Seoul); InGrid (Seoul); SM LVYIN (Seoul); SM Yellow Tail (Seoul)
- Genre: R&B
- Length: 23:09
- Languages: Japanese; English
- Labels: Avex Trax; SM Japan

Baekhyun chronology
Delight (2020)	Baekhyun (2021)	Bambi (2021)

Singles from Baekhyun
- 1. "Get You Alone" Released: January 4, 2021

Baekhyun (stylized in all caps) is the first Japanese extended play by South Korean singer Baekhyun. It was released on January 20, 2021, by SM Entertainment and Avex Trax. The album features six tracks, including the lead single "Get You Alone".

== Background and release ==
Baekhyun debuted as a solo artist in July 2019, with City Lights, and has since released two extended plays in South Korea, both of which were commercially successful domestically and internationally. His second extended play, Delight sold over 1,000,000 copies, making it the first South Korean soloist album to do so in 19 years, and one of the best-selling albums in South Korea.

On November 10, 2020, Baekhyun announced his Japanese debut through a short video message which was uploaded to Exo's official Japanese Twitter account. Following the announcement, Avex revealed the album covers and tracklist. The album was released in a total of six editions: five CDs and one CD+DVD. Pre-orders for the first press limited edition began on the same day. The music video for lead single "Get You Alone" premiered on Baekhyun's concert Baekhyun: Light on January 3, 2021. The next day, the single was released along with its music video.

== Live performance ==
On January 3, 2021, before the album's and the title track's release, Baekhyun performed "Get You Alone" on his solo concert for the first time.

== Track listing ==
Adapted from Exo's official website.

Baekhyun track listing
No.	Title	Lyrics	Music	Arrangement	Length
1.	"Get You Alone"	Junji Ishiwatari	Andy Love; Harold "Alawn" Philippon	Harold "Alawn" Philippon	4:06
2.	"Addicted"	Hiromitsu Toyosaki	Deez; Alexander Karlsson (JeL); Alexej Viktorovitch (JeL)	JeL	3:48
3.	"Whippin'"	Mahiro (Supa Love)	Deez; Yunsu (SOULTRiii); Saay (SOULTRiii)	SOULTRiii	3:51
4.	"Drown"	Hiromitsu Toyosaki	Frederik Jyll (GL Music)	Frederik Jyll (GL Music)	3:42
5.	"Disappeared"	miwaflower (miwa*)	David Amber; Andreas Öberg; JJ Evans (Joombas)	David Amber; Andreas Öberg	3:18
6.	"Stars"	Iren Miyagawa (Supa Love)	Erik Lidbom; Andrew Choi	Erik Lidbom	4:14
Total length:					23:09

=== DVD ===
1. Get You Alone -Music Video-
2. Off Shot Movie

== Charts ==
=== Weekly charts ===
Weekly chart performance for Baekhyun
Chart (2021)	Peak position
Japanese Albums (Oricon)	2
Japan Hot Albums (Billboard Japan)	2

=== Monthly charts ===
Monthly chart performance for Baekhyun
Chart (2021)	Peak position
Japanese Albums (Oricon)	5

=== Year-end charts ===
Year-end chart performance for Baekhyun
Chart (2021)	Position
Japanese Albums (Oricon)	82

== Certifications and sales ==
Certifications and sales for Baekhyun
Region	Certification	Certified units/sales
Japan (RIAJ)	Gold	49,431

== Release history ==
Region	Date	Format	Label	Ref
Japan	January 20, 2021	CD; DVD	Avex Trax	
Various	January 20, 2021	Digital download; streaming	Avex Trax	
