= UN Village =

2019 single by Baekhyun

Single by Baekhyun

from the EP City Lights
- Language: Korean
- Released: July 10, 2019
- Recorded: 2019
- Studio: SM LVYIN (Seoul)
- Genre: R&B
- Length: 3:55
- Label: SM; Dreamus
- Composers: LIØN; dress
- Lyricist: LIØN
- Producer: dress

Baekhyun singles chronology
| "Young" (2018) | "UN Village" (2019) | "My Love" (2020) |

Music video
- "UN Village" on YouTube

"UN Village" is a song recorded by South Korean singer Baekhyun. It was released on July 10, 2019, as the lead single of his debut extended play, City Lights. The song was written and composed by LIØN and dress. Musically, "UN Village" was described as a R&B song with groovy beats and string sounds.

Upon release, "Un Village" received generally positive reviews from music critics. Commercially, the song debuted at number 22 on the Gaon Digital Chart and charted at number 23 on the US World Digital Song Sales chart. An accompanying black-and-white themed music video for the song was released in conjunction with the release of the song. Baekhyun promoted the song with televised live performances on various South Korean music programs including Music Bank, Show! Music Core and Inkigayo.

== Background and release ==
On July 10, Baekhyun made his official debut as a solo artist with the extended play City Lights, which went onto debut at number one on South Korea's Gaon Album Chart, and became the best-selling solo album of 2019. "UN Village" was released on July 10 for digital download and streaming in various countries by SM Entertainment, as the lead single of City Lights.

== Composition ==
"UN Village" was described as an R&B song with a groovy beat and strings sound. In terms of musical notation, the song is composed in the key of F♯ minor, with a tempo of 84 beats per minute and is three minutes and fifty five seconds long. The lyrics are about a romantic moment a couple shares under the moonlight of UN Village hill in Hannam-dong, Yongsan District, Seoul.

== Reception ==
"UN Village" received generally favorable reviews from music critics. Riddhi Chakraborty from Rolling Stone India described "UN Village" as a "strong opener with complex and smooth R&B melodies". She added that "Baekhyun takes his time to build up effortless and intricate vocal runs but it’s still just a small taste of what his voice is truly capable of".

Year-end lists
| Critic/Publication | List | Rank | Ref. |
|---|---|---|---|
| Genius | The Genius Community's 50 Best Songs of 2019 | 49 | |
| Refinery29 | The Best K-Pop Songs Of 2019 | 9 | |
| CelebMix | Top 10 KPOP songs of 2019 | 10 | |

== Music video and promotion ==
An accompanying music video for "UN Village" was uploaded to SM Entertainment's official YouTube channel, simultaneously with the single's release. It was preceded by a teaser released on the same platform on July 4. The video features a colored and black-and-white theme of the singer while he roams around the titular neighborhood emoting his feelings as he sings. In a music video commentary video, Baekhyun revealed that the music video was shot in Paju, Gyeonggi Province, South Korea.

Before the official release, Baekhyun held a private showcase in Seoul Arts Center where he performed the song for the first time for the media. Two hours after the release, he held a live broadcast through Naver's V Live app, where he talked about the album, songs and production process.

On July 11, a behind clip of "UN Village" music video was released through Baekhyun's official YouTube channel as a vlog. Baekhyun promoted the song on various South Korean music programs starting with KBS's Music Bank on July 12, 2019. On the same day, he performed the song on the show You Hee-yeol's Sketchbook. On July 19, Baekhyun received his first music trophy for "UN Village" on KBS's Music Bank.

== Commercial performance ==
"UN Village" debuted at number 22 on the Gaon Digital chart issue dated July 7–13, 2019. The song also debuted at number two on the component Download Chart. Additionally, the song charted at number 23 on the US Billboard World Digital Song Sales chart.

== Accolades ==
Music program awards
| Program | Date | Ref. |
|---|---|---|
| Music Bank (KBS) | July 19, 2019 | |
| Music Bank (KBS) | July 26, 2019 | |
| Show! Music Core (MBC) | July 20, 2019 | |

== Credits and personnel ==
Credits adapted from album's liner notes.

=== Studio ===
- SM LVYIN Studio – recording
- doobdoob Studio – digital editing
- SM Booming System – engineered for mix
- SM Yellow Tail Studio – mixing
- Bernie Grundman Mastering – mastering

=== Personnel ===
- SM Entertainment – executive producer
- Lee Soo-man – producer
- Baekhyun – vocals, background vocals
- LIØN – lyrics, composition, background vocals
- dress – composition, arrangement, drums, bass, piano, synthesizer, strings
- Onestar – vocal directing
- Charming Lips – guitar
- Noh Min-ji – recording
- Jang Woo-young – digital editing
- Yoo Young-jin – engineered for mix, music and sound supervisor
- Gu Jong-pil – mixing
- Mike Bozzi – mastering

== Charts ==
=== Weekly ===
| Chart (2019) | Peak position |
|---|---|
| South Korea (Gaon) | 22 |
| South Korea (K-pop Hot 100) | 1 |
| US World Digital Songs (Billboard) | 23 |

=== Monthly ===
| Chart (2019) | Peak position |
|---|---|
| South Korea (Gaon) | 51 |

== Release history ==
| Region | Date | Format | Label |
|---|---|---|---|
| South Korea | July 10, 2019 | Digital download; streaming | SM; Dreamus |
| Various | July 10, 2019 | Digital download; streaming | SM |
