= Jaehyun discography =

- Studio albums: 1
- Singles: 9
- Promotional singles: 1

The South Korean singer and songwriter Jaehyun has released one studio album, nine singles (including one as a featured artist), and one promotional single. He debuted in 2016 and gained recognition as a member of the K-pop boy band NCT. In 2017, he released his first single, "Try Again"—a collaboration with the South Korean singer D.ear. Jaehyun's first standalone single, "Forever Only" (2022), marked his debut on South Korea's Circle Digital Chart and the US Billboard World Digital Song Sales chart. His first studio album, J (2024), debuted at number three on the Circle Album Chart, sold over 450,000 copies, and received a platinum certification in South Korea. It also peaked at number seven on the Oricon Albums Chart in Japan and number 18 on the US Top Album Sales chart. The album's lead single, "Smoke", reached the top five of the Circle Digital Chart.

== Studio albums ==
List of studio albums, with selected details, chart positions, sales figures, and certifications
Title	Details	Peak chart positions						Sales	Certifications
Title	Details	KOR	HUN Phy.	JPN	JPN Hot	US Heat	US Sales	Sales	Certifications
J	Released: August 26, 2024; Labels: SM, Kakao; Formats: CD, digital download, LP, streaming	3	35	7	7	11	18	KOR: 451,249; JPN: 13,909	KMCA: Platinum

== Singles ==
=== As lead artist ===
List of singles as lead artist, with year of release, selected chart positions, and associated album
Title	Year	Peak chart positions				Album
Title	Year	KOR	UK DL	US World	VIE	Album
"Try Again" (with D.ear)	2017	—	—	—	95	Non-album singles
"Forever Only"	2022	120	—	14	—	Non-album singles
"Horizon"	2023	38	—	—	—	Non-album singles
"Roses"	2024	— (Note: "Roses" did not enter the Circle Digital Chart but peaked at number 23 on the component Download Chart.)	—	—	—	J
"Dandelion"	2024	— (Note: "Dandelion" did not enter the Circle Digital Chart but peaked at number 18 on the component Download Chart.)	—	—	—	J
"Smoke"	2024	4	29	—	—	J
"Unconditional"	2024	— (Note: "Unconditional" did not enter the Circle Digital Chart but peaked at number 14 on the component Download Chart.)	—	—	—	Non-album singles
"99 Degrees"	2026	— (Note: "99 Degrees" did not enter the Circle Digital Chart but peaked at number 54 on the component Download Chart.)	—	—	—	Non-album singles
"—" denotes a recording that did not chart or was not released in that territory.

=== As featured artist ===
List of singles as featured artist, with year of release and associated album
Title	Year	Album
"Call It Off" (Emotional Oranges featuring Jaehyun)	2025	Non-album single

== Promotional singles ==
List of promotional singles, with year of release, selected chart positions, and associated album
Title	Year	Peak chart positions	Album
Title	Year	KOR DL	Album
"Look at Me"	2025	140	Dear.M Special

== Other charted songs ==
List of other charted songs, with year of release, selected chart positions, and associated album
Title	Year	Peak chart positions	Album
Title	Year	KOR DL	Album
"Flamin' Hot Lemon"	2024	54	J
"Completely"	2024	64	J
"Easy"	2024	68	J
"Can't Get You"	2024	67	J
"Smoke" (English version)	2024	87	J

== Writing credits ==
Key
Indicates songs in which writers are credited specifically for the Korean lyrics

List of songs by name, with credited artist(s), lyricist(s), composer(s), associated album, and year of release
Title	Artist(s)	Lyricist(s)	Composer(s)	Album	Year	Ref.
"99 Degrees"	Jaehyun	Jaehyun; Hyun; Simon Petrén; Shakka Philip		Non-album single	2026	
"Can't Get You"	Jaehyun	Jaehyun	Antonio Dixon; Patrick "J.Que" Smith; Kenny "Babyface" Edmonds	J	2024	
"Dancing in the Rain"	NCT U	Ji Yu-ri; Jinli; Jaehyun	Simon Petrén; Andreas Öberg; Ninos Hanna	NCT 2020 Resonance Pt. 1	2020	
"Dandelion"	Jaehyun	Jaehyun	Gabe Reali; Jackson Hirsh; Ryan Raines	J	2024	
"Easy"	Jaehyun	Jaehyun; Kang Eun-jeong; Anthony Watts; Tone Stith; Delilah Contreras; Tyler Holmes; Brandon "B Ham" Hamlin	Anthony Watts; Tone Stith; Delilah Contreras; Tyler Holmes; Brandon "B Ham" Hamlin	J	2024	
"Fire Truck" (소방차)	NCT 127	Taeyong; Mark; Jaehyun; Lee Seu-ran	LDN Noise; Tay Jasper; Ylva Dimberg	NCT #127	2016	
"Flamin' Hot Lemon"	Jaehyun	Jaehyun; Azad Naficy; Yonatan "Xsdtrk" Ayal		J	2024	
"Forever Only"	Jaehyun	Jaehyun; Ellie Suh	Dewain Whitmore Jr. Micah Premnath; Tido Nguyen	Non-album single	2022	
"Lost"	Jaehyun	Jaehyun	Jaehyun; Mingtion	—N/a	Unreleased	
"Horizon"	Jaehyun	Jaehyun	Deez; Soul Fish; Jaehyun	Non-album single	2023	
"Roses"	Jaehyun	Jaehyun; Taneisha Jackson; Morgan Connie Smith; Shakka Philip; Charlotte Wilson; Hyun	Jaehyun; Bhavik Pattani; Taneisha Jackson; Morgan Connie Smith; Shakka Philip; Charlotte Wilson; Hyun	J	2024	
"Smoke"	Jaehyun	Jaehyun; Wutan	Marcus Lomax; Tatu; Jorgen Odegard	J	2024	
"Timeless"	Jaehyun	Jaehyun; Moon Yeo-reum; Hyun; Bhavik Pattani; Charlotte Wilson; Ebenezer Fabiyi	Jaehyun; Hyun; Bhavik Pattani; Charlotte Wilson; Ebenezer Fabiyi	—N/a	Unreleased	
"Unconditional"	Jaehyun	Jaehyun; Hyun; Taneisha Jackson	Jaehyun; Hyun; Bhavik Pattani; Taneisha Jackson	Non-album single	2024	
