= SM Station discography =

SM Station is a digital music project by South Korean record label SM Entertainment. It undertook to release one digital single every Friday starting from February 3, 2016.

== Compilation album ==
Title	Album details	Peak chart position	Sales
Title	Album details	KOR	Sales
SM Station Season 1	Released: April 6, 2017; Label: SM Entertainment; Formats: CD	11	KOR: 3,921

== Season ==
=== 2016–2017: Season 1 ===
Title	Artists/Producers	Release date	Peak chart positions		Sales (DL)
Title	Artists/Producers	Release date	KOR	US World	Sales (DL)
2016
"Rain"	Taeyeon	February 3	1	3	KOR: 2,500,000
"Tell Me (What Is Love)"	D.O. × Yoo Young-jin	February 19	12	2	KOR: 145,281
"Because of You"	Kenzie × Matthew Tishler × Yoon Mi-rae	February 26	19	—	KOR: 184,125
"Spring Love" (봄인가 봐)	Eric Nam × Wendy	March 4	7	—	KOR: 820,131
"Deoksugung Stonewall Walkway" (덕수궁 돌담길의 봄)	Yoona (feat. 10cm)	March 11	24	7	KOR: 194,752
"Your Voice" (한마디)	Heritage × Jonghyun	March 18	106	—	KOR: 29,836
"Borders"	Amber	March 25	205	—	—N/a
"Regrets and Resolutions"	Kim Il-ji × Moon Jung-jae	April 1	—	—	—N/a
"Lil' Something" (썸타)	Chen × Heize × Vibe	April 8	12	17	KOR: 402,402
"Narcissus" (나르시스)	M&D (Heechul, Jungmo) × Wheein (of Mamamoo)	April 15	140	—	—N/a
"Pain Poem" (서툰 시)	Kim Bum-soo × Kenzie	April 22	97	—	KOR: 26,548
"Mindjack"	Inlayer	April 29	—	—	—N/a
"Wave"	R3hab × f(Luna+Amber) × Xavi&Gi	May 6	—	5	—N/a
"The Day"	Baekhyun × K.Will	May 13	8	21	KOR: 351,025
"Touch You" (울려 퍼져라)	Dana	May 20	228	—	—N/a
"Monodrama" (独角戏)	Lay	May 27	155	5	—N/a
"You're The Boss" (너만 잘났냐)	Kim Sook × Yoon Jung-soo	June 3	—	—	—N/a
"Heartbreak Hotel"	Tiffany (feat. Simon Dominic)	June 10	84	—	KOR: 29,145
"No Matter What"	BoA × Beenzino	June 17	7	17	KOR: 246,889
"Definition of Love"	Lee Dong Woo × Orphée Noah	June 24	—	20	—N/a
"My Hero" (나의 영웅)	Cho Yeongsu × Kassy × Leeteuk × Suho	July 1	177	—	—N/a
"Way Back Home" (집 앞에서)	J-Min × Sim Eun-jee	July 8	—	—	—N/a
"My Show"	Cha Ji-yeon × LDN Noise	July 15	—	—	—N/a
"All Mine"	f(x)	July 22	12	2	KOR: 229,115
"Taste the Feeling"	NCT 127 × Coca-Cola	July 29	—	—	—N/a
"Sailing (0805)" (그 여름 (0805))	Girls' Generation	August 5	13	6	KOR: 181,696
"Starry Night" (밤과 별의 노래)	Lee Jin-ah × Onew	August 12	47	—	KOR: 65,044
"Secret"	Seohyun × Yuri	August 19	149	10	KOR: 11,481
"Born to be Wild"	Hyoyeon × Jo Kwon × Min × JYP	August 26	164	11	—N/a
"$10"	Hitchhiker	September 2	—	—	—N/a
"Pit-A-Pat" (두근두근)	SM × BANA	September 9	—	—	—N/a
"Dancing King"	Exo × Yoo Jae-suk	September 17	2	2	KOR: 648,506
"Cosmic"	Bada × Ryeowook	September 23	—	—	—N/a
"Heartbeat"	Amber × Luna (feat. Ferry Corsten, Kago Pengchi)	October 2	—	—	—N/a
"Years"	Alesso × Chen	October 7	—	—	KOR: 21,726
"Runnin'" (우리 둘)	Henry × Soyou	October 14	—	—	KOR: 30,801
"Music is Wonderful"	BeatBurger (feat. BoA)	October 19	—	—	—N/a
"Nightmare"	Yoon Do-hyun × Reddy × G2 × Inlayer × Johnny	October 28	—	—	—N/a
"Always In My Heart" (이별을 배웠어)	Joy × Seulong	November 4	10	—	KOR: 415,367
"Still" (보여)	Kim Tae-hyun × Sunday	November 10	—	—	—N/a
"Sweet Dream" (나비잠)	Kim Hee-chul × Min Kyung-hoon	November 19	1	—	KOR: 938,837+
"Love [story]"	S.E.S.	November 27	22	—	KOR: 63,930
"Mystery"	Hyoyeon	December 2	—	12	—N/a
"Inspiration"	Jonghyun	December 9	—	19	—N/a
"It's You" (그대라서)	Luna × Shin Yong-jae	December 16	95	—	KOR: 23,501
"Have Yourself A Merry Little Christmas"	Wendy × Moon Jung-jae × Nile Lee	December 23	—	46	—N/a
"Sound of Your Heart" (너의 목소리)	SM Town × Steve Barakatt	December 30	—	—	—N/a
2017
"Road" (길)	TraxX	January 6	—	—	—N/a
"Sparks Fly"	Yoon Do-hyun	January 13	—	—	—N/a
"Darling U"	Seulgi × Yesung	January 22	—	—	—N/a
"When My Loneliness Comes Out To You" (나의 외로움이 널 부를 때)	Punch	January 27	—	—	—N/a
"Curtain" (커튼)	Suho × Song Young-joo	February 3	74	16	KOR: 70,125+
"—" denotes releases that did not chart or were not released in that region

=== 2017–2018: Season 2 ===
Title	Artists/Producers	Release date	Peak chart positions		Sales (DL)
Title	Artists/Producers	Release date	KOR	US World	Sales (DL)
2017
"Would U"	Red Velvet	March 31	13	—	KOR: 188,237+
"Dream In A Dream" (夢中夢, 몽중몽)	Ten	April 7	—	5	US: 1,000+
"Take You Home" (바래다줄게)	Baekhyun	April 14	12	5	KOR: 400,795+
"To Be Alive"	Stanley Clarke Band (feat. Chris Clarke)	April 21	—	—	—N/a
"Spring Rain" (봄비)	BoA	April 28	—	—	KOR: 21,479+
"Lullaby" (수면제)	Onew × Roco (of Rocoberry)	May 5	60	—	KOR: 30,186+
"Around"	Hitchhiker × Taeyong	May 12	—	—	—N/a
"E-12" (Live)	Myron McKinley Trio	May 19	—	—	—N/a
"Nostalgia"	Kim Se-hwang × Jungmo	May 26	—	—	—N/a
"Marry Man"	Shindong X UV	June 2	—	—	—N/a
"Easy" (쉽게)	Vinicius	June 9	—	—	—N/a
"New Beginning"	Astrid Holiday	June 16	—	—	—N/a
"Stranger's Love"	Jang Jin-young × The Barberettes	June 23	—	—	—N/a
"Decalcomanie"	Imlay × Sik-K	June 30	—	—	—N/a
"Young & Free"	Xiumin × Mark	July 7	31	6	KOR: 72,133
"All That You Want"	The Solutions	July 14	—	—	—N/a
"Lemonade Love"	Parc Jae-jung × Mark	July 21	197	—	—N/a
"Love Like You"	Charli Taft	July 28	—	—	—N/a
"Cure" (함께)	Taeyong × Yoo Young-jin	August 5	—	—	—N/a
"Hunnit"	Penomeco	August 11	—	—	—N/a
"Rebirth" (환생)	Red Velvet	August 18	78	25	KOR: 51,816+
"Man in the Mirror"	Myron Mckinley Trio × Stanley Clarke × Verdine White	August 28	—	—	—N/a
"When The Wind Blows" (바람이 불면)	Yoona	September 8	—	8	—N/a
"U&I" (쟤 보지 마)	Henry × Sunny	September 15	—	—	—N/a
"Daylight & Cerulean High"	Imlay	September 22	—	—	—N/a
"Drop"	U-Know Yunho	September 25	—	—	—N/a
"In a Different Life" (여정)	Max Changmin	September 28	—	—	—N/a
"Star Blossom" (별빛이 피면)	Doyoung × Kim Se-jeong	October 13	—	—	—N/a
"Power" (Remix version)	Exo × R3hab	October 20	—	—	—N/a
"Power" (Remix version)	Exo × Dash Berlin	October 20	—	—	—N/a
"Power" (Remix version)	Exo × Imlay	October 20	—	—	—N/a
"Power" (Remix version)	Exo × Shaun	October 20	—	—	—N/a
"Doll" 인형)	Kangta × Seulgi × Wendy	October 27	—	—	—N/a
"Bye Babe"	10cm × Chen	November 3	30	24	KOR: 106,108+
"Thirsty" (OFF-SICK Concert version)	Taemin	November 10	—	—	—N/a
"Atmosphere"	Juncoco × Advanced (feat. Ailee)	November 16	—	—	—N/a
"Try Again"	D.ear × Jaehyun	November 24	—	—	—N/a
"The Little Match Girl" (성냥팔이 소녀)	Baek A-yeon × Wendy	December 1	55	—	KOR: 71,284+
"Charm Of Life" (짬에서 나오는 바이브)	Eunhyuk × Heechul × Shindong × Solar	December 8	—	—	—N/a
"Joy"	NCT Dream	December 15	—	—	—N/a
"Dear My Family" (Live Concert version) (Tribute to Jonghyun)	SM Town (Kangta, Yesung, BoA, Kyuhyun, Taeyeon, Jonghyun, Baekhyun, Chen, D.O., Luna, Wendy, Jaehyun)	December 29	—	—	—N/a
2018
"Lower"	Amber × Luna	January 5	—	4	—N/a
"Timeless" (텐데...)	NCT U (Taeil, Doyoung, Jaehyun)	January 12	—	—	—N/a
"Man In The Mirror"	BoA × Siedah Garrett	January 16	—	—	—N/a
"Always Find You"	Raiden × Yuri	January 26	—	—	—N/a
"Nikolai Kapustin : Piano Quintet 1st Mov. Allegro"	Moon Jung-jae × Pace	February 2	—	—	—N/a
"Free Somebody" (with everysing)	Heda × Luna	February 9	—	—	—N/a
"I Kicked My Luck Off" (복을 발로 차벘렸어)	Kang Ho-dong × Hong Jin-young	February 17	100	—	—N/a
"Notorious"	TraxX × LIP2SHOT (feat. Sophiya)	February 23	—	—	—N/a
"Daydream" (낮 꿈)	Sungmin	March 2	—	—	—N/a
"Dinner"	Suho × Jang Jae-in	March 10	—	—	—N/a
"Privacy"	Yeseo	March 16	—	—	—N/a
"Super Duper"	Super Junior	March 23	—	—	—N/a
"You"	Ginjo (feat. Angel)	March 30	—	—	—N/a
"New Heroes"	Ten	April 6	—	4	—N/a
"—" denotes releases that did not chart or were not released in that region. Note: Record chart Gaon stopped releasing detailed data for the download chart starting 2018.

=== 2018–2019: Season 3 ===
Title	Artists/Producers	Release date	Peak chart positions		
Title	Artists/Producers	Release date	KOR	KOR Hot	US World
2018
"Coffee Break"	Jonah Nilsson × Lucas (feat. Richard Bona)	November 29	—	—	—
"Hair in the Air"	Jaemin × Jeno × Renjun × Yeri	December 13	—	—	—
"Best Day Ever"	Haechan × Chenle × Jisung	December 13	—	—	—
"Whatcha Doin'" (지금 어디야?)	Chungha x Yesung	December 17	–	–	—
"Candle Light" (사랑한단 뜻이야)	NCT Dream	December 27	—	—	—
2019
"Carpet"	Bumkey × Yesung	January 10	—	—	—
"Loss" (상실)	Colde	January 24	—	—	—
"Cold"	Key (feat. Hanhae)	February 14	—	—	—
"Cheer Man" (치어맨)	Shindong × UV	February 28	—	—	—
"Dear Diary" (스물에게)	Yeri	March 14	200	—	—
"I'm Home" (그래)	Minho	March 28	—	—	12
"SSFW" (봄 여름 가을 겨울)	Chanyeol	April 25	174	—	—
"You" (이유)	Xiumin	May 9	68	32	—
"Nada"	Hitchhiker	May 23	—	—	—
"Don't Need Your Love"	HRVY × NCT Dream	June 6	—	—	4
"The Love in You" (완전한 사랑)	Lee Dong-woo × Song Kwang-sik	June 21	—	—	—
"That's Okay" (괜찮아도 괜찮아)	D.O.	July 1	12	19	11
"Long Flight"	Taeyong	July 18	—	—	6
"—" denotes items that did not chart or were not released.

=== 2020–2024: Season 4 ===
Title	Artists/Producers	Release date	Peak chart positions		
Title	Artists/Producers	Release date	KOR	KOR Hot	US World
"Still Standing" (봄은 너니까)	Suran × Yesung	May 1	—	—	—
"Sugar"	Hitchhiker × Sokodomo	May 15	—	—	—
"Love Again" (Live Version)	Baekhyun	May 29	—	—	—
"Midnight Story" (Live Version)	Super Junior-K.R.Y.	June 15	—	—	—
"Happy" (Summer Version)	Taeyeon	June 26	—	—	—
"Red Flavor" (빨간 맛) (Orchestra Version)	Park In Young × Seoul Philharmonic Orchestra	July 18	—	—	—
"End of a Day" (하루의 끝) (Orchestra Version)	Park In Young × Seoul Philharmonic Orchestra	July 23	—	—	—
"Think About Me"	Hyo x Raiden (feat. Coogie)	October 30	—	—	—
"All That Love"	Max Changmin	November 13	—	—	—
"Be Your Enemy" (Live Version)	Taemin	November 27	—	—	—
2021
"Cough Syrup" (감기약)	Kangta	January 14	—	—	—
"Tomorrow"	Chanyeol	April 6	—	—	9
"Coffee" (커피) (Live Version)	Kyuhyun	April 19	—	—	—
"Paint Me Naked"	Ten	August 10	—	—	—
"The Promise of H.O.T. (Jazz Ver.) (우리들의 맹세)	-	November 26	—	—	—
"Way" (별 하나)	Onew X Punch	December 6	127	—	—
"Dreams Come True"	Aespa x BoA	December 20	8	7	7
2022
"Endless Night" (긴 밤)	Kim Min-jong	February 21	—	—	—
"Love Theory"	Taeyong X Wonstein	April 14	139	—	8
"Cause You" (혼잣말이 많아졌어) (Prod. Kangta)	Kangta X Youngjun (Brown Eyed Soul) X Lee Ye-joon	June 29	—	N/A	—
"Nap Fairy" (낮잠)	Yeri X Sam Kim	August 25	—	N/A	—
2023
"Miracle" (안부)	Wendy X MeloMance	January 26	170	N/A	—
"Love Me Crazy"	Lim Kim X Jamie	February 28	— (Note: "Love Me Crazy" did not enter the Circle Digital Chart, but peaked at number 138 on the Circle Download Chart.)	—	—
"When I Close My Eyes"	Kangta X Lee A-reum	April 20	—	—	—
"Hybrid"	Ha Hyun-woo X Max Changmin	May 4	— (Note: "Hybrid" did not enter the Circle Digital Chart, but peaked at number 145 on the Circle Download Chart.)	—	—
"Bloom" (나의꽃, 나의 빛)	Chen & Yang Hee-eun	May 30	— (Note: "Bloom" did not enter the Circle Digital Chart, but peaked at number 123 on the Circle Download Chart.)	—	—
"Different Hearts"	Ginjo x Sole	August 30	—	—	—
2024
"Regret of the Times (2024 Remake Ver.)" (시대유감)	Aespa	January 15	120	—	—
"—" denotes items that did not chart or were not released.

== Special ==
=== 2018: Station X 0 (Young) ===
Title	Artists/Producers	Release date	Peak chart positions		
Title	Artists/Producers	Release date	KOR	KOR Hot	US World
"Page 0"	MeloMance × Taeyeon	August 10	38	42	—
"Young"	Baekhyun × Loco	August 31	11	18	4
"We Young"	Chanyeol × Sehun	September 14	72	71	3
"Wow Thing"	Chungha × Seulgi × SinB × Soyeon	September 28	35	43	3
"Written in the Stars"	John Legend × Wendy	October 19	—	—	5
"—" denotes items that did not chart or were not released.

=== 2019: SM Station X 4 LOVEs for Winter ===
Title	Artists/Producers	Release date	Peak chart positions	
Title	Artists/Producers	Release date	KOR	US World
"This is Your Day (for every child, UNICEF)"	SM Town(BoA, Siwon, Sunny, J-Min, Taemin, Suho, Wendy, Doyoung)	November 20	—	—
"Coming Home"	NCT U (Taeil, Doyoung, Jaehyun, Haechan)	December 13	—	7
"White Winter"	Woojoo Jjokkomi (Kim Hee-chul × Lee Soo-geun)	December 15	—	—
"—" denotes items that did not chart or were not released.

=== 2020: Our Beloved BoA ===
Title	Artists/Producers	Release date	Peak chart positions		
Title	Artists/Producers	Release date	KOR	KOR Hot	US World
"Garden in the Air" (공중정원)	Baekhyun	July 31	83	78	—
"Atlantis Princess" (아틀란티스 소녀)	Bolbbalgan4	August 7	36	—	—
"Only One"	Gallant	August 14	—	—	—
"Milky Way"	Red Velvet	August 21	119	64	—
"Tree" (나무)	Park In Young × Seoul Philharmonic Orchestra	August 28	—	—	—
"—" denotes items that did not chart or were not released.

=== 2021–2023: MV Remastering Project ===
Title	Artists/Producers	Release date
2021
"Warrior's Descendant (Age of Violence)" (전사의 후예 (폭력시대))	H.O.T.	November 4
"Dreams Come True"	S.E.S.	November 11
"Only One"	Shinhwa	November 18
"Day by Day"	Fly to the Sky	November 25
"The Promise of H.O.T." (우리들 맹세)	H.O.T.	November 26
"The Promise of H.O.T." (우리들 맹세) (Jazz Ver.)	Yohan Kim X Hogyu 'Stiger' Hwang	November 26
"ID; Peace B"	BoA	December 2
"Agape" (...지애 (之愛))	Yoo Young-jin	December 9
"Angel Eyes"	SM Town (Kangta, Moon Hee-jun, S.E.S., Shinhwa, Fly to the Sky, BoA, Dana (The Grace), M.I.L.K)	December 16
"Hope" (빛)	H.O.T.	December 23
2022
"U"	Super Junior	January 14
"Into the New World" (다시 만난 세계)	Girls' Generation	January 21
"Perfect Man"	Shinhwa	February 3
"In The Sky"	Black Beat	February 10
"Come To Me"	M.I.L.K.	February 17
"I yah!" (아이야!)	H.O.T.	February 24
"My Name"	BoA	March 2
"('Cause) I'm Your Girl"	S.E.S.	March 10
"Too Good"	The Grace	March 16
"Missing You"	Fly to the Sky	March 24
"I Swear"	S	March 31
"Hug"	TVXQ	April 6
"Show Me Your Love" (감싸안으며)	S.E.S.	April 14
"Replay" (누난 너무 예뻐)	Shinee	April 20
"Paradox"	TraxX	May 4
"Tri-Angle"	TVXQ (feat. BoA and TraxX)	May 11
"Full of Happiness" (행복)	H.O.T.	May 19
"Yo!" (악동보고서)	Shinhwa	May 26
"Gee"	Girls' Generation	June 2
"Scandal"	Kangta & Vanness	June 8
"Just in Love"	S.E.S.	June 16
"Summer Vacation"	SM Town	June 23
"Hello Summer"	SM Town	June 30
"Hero"	Shinhwa	July 7
"Hot Mail"	SM Town	July 14
"Dancing Out"	Super Junior	July 20
"Red Sun"	SM Town	July 27
"Drive"	TVXQ	August 3
"Sea of Love"	Fly to the Sky	August 18
"Happiness"	Super Junior	August 27
"Girls on Top"	BoA	September 2
"Hi Ya Ya!"	TVXQ	September 13
"I Pray 4 U"	Shinhwa	September 22
"Love"	S.E.S.	September 29
"Sorry, Sorry"	Super Junior	October 5
"Gravity" (중력)	Fly to the Sky	October 12
"Outside Castle (The Castle Outsiders)"	H.O.T.	October 19
"Until the End of the World" (세상 끝까지)	Dana	October 26
"Memories" (사랑은 기억보다)	Kangta	November 10
"Timeless"	Zhang Liyin featuring Xiah	November 16
"Timeless"	Zhang Liyin featuring Xiah	November 23
"Candy"	H.O.T.	December 1
"Merry-Chri" (메리-크리)	BoA	December 7
"Jingle Bell"	SM Town	December 15
"My Angel My Light"	SM Town	December 22
"Dear My Family"	SM Town	December 29
2023
"Rising Sun"	TVXQ	January 13
"One"	Isak N Jiyeon	January 19
"La Cha Ta"	f(x)	April 11

=== 2022–2023: NCT Lab ===
Title	Artists/Producers	Release date	Peak chart positions		
Title	Artists/Producers	Release date	KOR	KOR Billb. (Note: Includes the Billboard K-pop Hot 100 (defunct as of 2022), and South Korea Songs (part of Billboard's Hits of the World (2022 onwards)).)	US World
2022
"Child"	Mark	February 4	23	48	8
"Conextion (Age of Light)"	NCT U (Doyoung, Mark, Haechan)	March 20	—	—	—
"Rain Day"	NCT U (Taeil, Kun, Yangyang)	July 19	— (Note: "Rain Day" did not enter the Circle Digital Chart, but peaked at number 80 on the Circle Download Chart.)	—	—
"Forever Only"	Jaehyun	August 18	120	—	14
"Birthday"	Ten	October 26	—	—	—
2023
"Golden Hour"	Mark	April 7	112	—	13
"Horizon"	Jaehyun	August 8	38	—	—
"N.Y.C.T"	NCT U (Taeil, Haechan)	September 7	—	—	—
"Phantom (KUN Remix)"	Kun	November 15	—	—	—
"Marine Turtle"	NCT U (Kun, Xiaojun, Renjun, Chenle)	December 6	—	—	—
"—" denotes items that did not chart or were not released in that region.

== See also ==
- "Cabi Song", a 2010 collaborative single between SM Entertainment artist Girls' Generation and JYP Entertainment artist 2PM
- PYL Younique Volume 1, a 2012 single album of collaborative music between SM Entertainment artists and non-SM Entertainment artists
- Toheart (band), a South Korean duo composed of SM Entertainment's Key and Woollim Entertainment's Woohyun, active in 2014
