= Love Playlist =

South Korean web series

- Season 4 promotional poster
- Hangul: 연애 플레이리스트
- RR: Yeonae peulleiriseuteu
- MR: Yŏnae p'ŭlleirisŭt'ŭ
- Genre: Romance; Youth
- Written by: Lee Seul; Choi Yo-ji; Kim Jae-hyuk
- Directed by: Shin Jae-rim; Jung Eun-ha; Kim Seo-yoon; Yoo Hee-on
- Starring: See list
- Country of origin: South Korea
- Original language: Korean
- No. of seasons: 4
- No. of episodes: 48 (+ 7 specials)

Production
- Producers: Park Jin-ho; Yang So-young; Han A-reum
- Camera setup: Single camera
- Running time: 5–27 minutes
- Production company: PlayList Global

Original release
- Network: V Live; Naver TV Cast; YouTube; Facebook; Instagram
- Release: March 9, 2017 – August 14, 2019

Related
- Dear. M (2022)

Love Playlist (Korean: 연애 플레이리스트; RR: Yeonae peulleiriseuteu) is a South Korean web series. Spanning over four seasons, its episodes were released through PlayList Global's V Live, Naver TV Cast, YouTube, Facebook and Instagram official channels from March 9, 2017 to August 8, 2019. As of March 2020, the series has earned 630 million views.

Its television spin-off Dear.M was scheduled to air on KBS2 in 2021, but postponed to 2022 due to school bullying allegations against actress Park Hye-su.

== Synopsis ==
Love Playlist revolves around a group of college students as they learn about the joys and sorrows of relationships and breakups.

== Main cast ==
Character	Portrayed by	Season			
Character	Portrayed by	Season 1 (2017)	Season 2 (2017)	Season 3 (2018)	Season 4 (2019)
Lee Hyun-seung	Kim Hyung-seok	Main	Main	Main	Main
Jung Ji-won	Jung Shin-hye	Main	Main	Main	Main
Han Jae-in	Lee Yoo-jin	Main	Main	Main	Main
Kim Min-woo	Choi Hee-seung	Main	Main	Main	Guest
Kwak Jun-mo	Lim Hwi-win	Main	Main	Main	Guest
Kang Yoon	Park Jung-woo	Recurring	Main	Guest	Main
Kim Do-young	Min Hyo-won		Main	Main	Guest
Choi Seung-hyuk	Kim Woo-seok		Recurring	Main	
Jung Pu-reum	Park Shi-an			Recurring	Main
Park Ha-neul	Bae Hyun-sung			Recurring	Main
Seo Ji-min	Kim Sae-ron				Main

== Episodes ==
=== Series overview ===
Season	Episodes	Originally released	
Season	Episodes	First released	Last released
Pilot	2	January 26, 2017	January 28, 2017
1	8	March 9, 2017	April 1, 2017
2	12	June 29, 2017	August 12, 2017
3	12	September 20, 2018	October 27, 2018
4	16	June 22, 2019	August 14, 2019

=== Pilot (2017) ===
No. overall	No. in season	Title	Directed by	Written by	Original release date
Pilot	1	"My Boyfriend Is Drinking With Another Girl"	Shin Jae-rim	Lee Sol	January 26, 2017
Pilot	2	"My Guy Friend Has a Girlfriend"	Shin Jae-rim	Lee Sol	January 28, 2017

=== Season 1 (2017) ===
No. overall	No. in season	Title	Directed by	Written by	Original release date
1	1	"I Have Three Male Friends"	Shin Jae-rim	Lee Sol	March 9, 2017
2	2	"What Freshmen Have to Be Most Careful of"	Shin Jae-rim	Lee Sol	March 11, 2017
3	3	"The Real Reason Why My Boyfriend Likes Me"	Shin Jae-rim	Lee Sol	March 16, 2017
4	4	"What Happens When Men and Women are Just Friends"	Shin Jae-rim	Lee Sol	March 18, 2017
5	5	"My Boyfriend's Female Friend Gets on My Nerves"	Shin Jae-rim	Lee Sol	March 23, 2017
6	6	"Reasons Why Women Say They Want to Break Up"	Shin Jae-rim	Lee Sol	March 25, 2017
7	7	"The Advantage of Drunken Confessions"	Shin Jae-rim	Lee Sol	March 30, 2017
8	8	"The Process of Men Falling in Love"	Shin Jae-rim	Lee Sol	April 1, 2017
Special
X	X	"The Way of a Lovely Couple's Chatting"	Shin Jae-rim	Lee Sol	April 6, 2017

=== Season 2 (2017) ===
No. overall	No. in season	Title	Directed by	Written by	Original release date
9	1	"I Asked My Friend Who's a Boy to Do Consultations on Love For Me"	Shin Jae-rim	Lee Sol	June 29, 2017
10	2	"The Reason Why Men Become Jealous"	Shin Jae-rim	Lee Sol	July 1, 2017
11	3	"Unexpected Starting of a Relationship"	Shin Jae-rim	Lee Sol	July 6, 2017
12	4	"How to Figure Out Whether It's Flirting or Not"	Shin Jae-rim	Lee Sol	July 8, 2017
13	5	"Thoughts of Men and Women on Anniversaries"	Shin Jae-rim	Lee Sol	July 13, 2017
14	6	"The Moment of the Ending of Flirting"	Shin Jae-rim	Lee Sol	July 15, 2017
15	7	"What a Guy Who's Having a First Date Thinks"	Shin Jae-rim	Lee Sol	July 20, 2017
16	8	"Process of Giving Up Unrequited Love"	Shin Jae-rim	Lee Sol	July 22, 2017
17	9	"Reasons of Breaking Up"	Shin Jae-rim	Lee Sol	July 27, 2017
18	10	"The Reason Why We Date"	Shin Jae-rim	Lee Sol	July 29, 2017
19	11	"The Steps For a Couple's First Night"	Shin Jae-rim	Lee Sol	August 10, 2017
20	12	"Could a Broken Couple Get Together Again"	Shin Jae-rim	Lee Sol	August 12, 2017
Special
X	X	"Unexpected Moments of Missing Ex-Boyfriend"	Shin Jae-rim	Lee Sol	August 5, 2017

=== Season 3 (2018) ===
No. overall	No. in season	Title	Directed by	Written by	Original release date
21	1	"Depressing Moment After a Breakup"	Jung Eun-ha & Kim Seo-yoon	Lee Sol	September 20, 2018
22	2	"Psych of a Guy Who Doesn't Ask Out"	Jung Eun-ha & Kim Seo-yoon	Lee Sol	September 22, 2018
23	3	"The Fastest Way to Recover From a Breakup"	Jung Eun-ha & Kim Seo-yoon	Lee Sol	September 27, 2018
24	4	"Characteristics of a Girl Who Can't Stay in a Relationship"	Jung Eun-ha & Kim Seo-yoon	Lee Sol	September 29, 2018
25	5	"A Woman That Men Can't Resist"	Jung Eun-ha & Kim Seo-yoon	Lee Sol	October 4, 2018
26	6	"Advantages of Having a Guy Friend"	Jung Eun-ha & Kim Seo-yoon	Lee Sol	October 6, 2018
27	7	"Moment You Want Your Ex Back"	Jung Eun-ha & Kim Seo-yoon	Lee Sol	October 11, 2018
28	8	"A Guy You Shouldn't Let Go of"	Jung Eun-ha & Kim Seo-yoon	Lee Sol	October 18, 2018
29	9	"What Happens When You Drink With Your Ex"	Jung Eun-ha & Kim Seo-yoon	Lee Sol	October 20, 2018
30	10	"When Your First Love Is Unrequited"	Jung Eun-ha & Kim Seo-yoon	Lee Sol	October 25, 2018
31	11	"Stages of Falling in Love with Your Close Friend"	Jung Eun-ha & Kim Seo-yoon	Lee Sol	October 27, 2018
32	12	"Is It Okay To Get Back With My Ex?"	Jung Eun-ha & Kim Seo-yoon	Lee Sol	October 27, 2018
Specials
X	X	"Stages of a Couple's First Kiss"	Jung Eun-ha & Kim Seo-yoon	Lee Sol	October 29, 2018
X	X	"I Think My Close Friend Has a Crush On Me"	Jung Eun-ha & Kim Seo-yoon	Lee Sol	November 1, 2018
X	X	"Why You Shouldn't Drink With Your Crush"	Jung Eun-ha & Kim Seo-yoon	Lee Sol	November 2, 2018

=== Season 4 (2019) ===
No. overall	No. in season	Title	Directed by	Written by	Original release date
33	1	"The Worst Situation to Run Into Your Ex-Boyfriend"	Yoo Hee-on	Lee Sol, Choi Yo-ji & Kim Jae-hyuk	June 22, 2019
34	2	"How to Have a Crush on Someone Without Showing My Feelings"	Yoo Hee-on	Lee Sol, Choi Yo-ji & Kim Jae-hyuk	June 26, 2019
35	3	"How to Check If You Still Have Feelings for Your Ex"	Yoo Hee-on	Lee Sol, Choi Yo-ji & Kim Jae-hyuk	June 29, 2019
36	4	"When a Guy You Like Turns Up at a Group Date"	Yoo Hee-on	Lee Sol, Choi Yo-ji & Kim Jae-hyuk	July 3, 2019
37	5	"How an Ideal Boyfriend Reacts to His Girlfriend's Belly Fat"	Yoo Hee-on	Lee Sol, Choi Yo-ji & Kim Jae-hyuk	July 6, 2019
38	6	"Hopeless Romantics Have a Reason Too"	Yoo Hee-on	Lee Sol, Choi Yo-ji & Kim Jae-hyuk	July 10, 2019
39	7	"I Went on a Double Date with My Ex-Boyfriend"	Yoo Hee-on	Lee Sol, Choi Yo-ji & Kim Jae-hyuk	July 13, 2019
40	8	"The Reason Why I Keep Having Crapy Crushes"	Yoo Hee-on	Lee Sol, Choi Yo-ji & Kim Jae-hyuk	July 17, 2019
41	9	"Reason Why Exam Week Is a F**ked Week"	Yoo Hee-on	Lee Sol, Choi Yo-ji & Kim Jae-hyuk	July 20, 2019
42	10	"A Friend I Trusted Stabbed Me In the Back"	Yoo Hee-on	Lee Sol, Choi Yo-ji & Kim Jae-hyuk	July 24, 2019
43	11	"Getting Drunk and Causing a Scene In Front of the Person You Like"	Yoo Hee-on	Lee Sol, Choi Yo-ji & Kim Jae-hyuk	July 27, 2019
44	12	"How a College Student Decides to Drop Out"	Yoo Hee-on	Lee Sol, Choi Yo-ji & Kim Jae-hyuk	July 31, 2019
45	13	"I Spent the Day with My Ex-Boyfriend"	Yoo Hee-on	Lee Sol, Choi Yo-ji & Kim Jae-hyuk	August 3, 2019
46	14	"What Couples Go Through Before the Guy Goes to the Military"	Yoo Hee-on	Lee Sol, Choi Yo-ji & Kim Jae-hyuk	August 7, 2019
47	15	"Why You Have to Be Honest with the Person You Like"	Yoo Hee-on	Lee Sol, Choi Yo-ji & Kim Jae-hyuk	August 10, 2019
48	16	"A Perfect Example of a Straightforward Love Confession"	Yoo Hee-on	Lee Sol, Choi Yo-ji & Kim Jae-hyuk	August 14, 2019
Specials
X	X	"What Guys Can Say to Get a Reaction From Their Girlfriends"	Yoo Hee-on	Lee Sol, Choi Yo-ji & Kim Jae-hyuk	July 1, 2019
X	X	"Things That Makes Someone Living Apart From Family Angry"	Yoo Hee-on	Lee Sol, Choi Yo-ji & Kim Jae-hyuk	August 1, 2019

== Original soundtrack ==
=== Season 2 ===
Album + Bonus Track

Album

Released on August 19, 2017
No.	Title	Artist	Length
1.	"Never Ending"	Project Loveplay	3:36
2.	"Toy"	Brother Su, Yoo Yeon-jung (Cosmic Girls)	3:37
3.	"Hey"	Paul Kim	3:28
4.	"If Only"	Kim Na-young	4:31
5.	"Never Ending" (Inst.)		3:36
6.	"Toy" (Inst.)		3:37
7.	"Hey" (Inst.)		3:28
8.	"If Only" (Inst.)		4:31

Bonus Track

Released on September 7, 2017
No.	Title	Artist	Length
1.	"Breeze"	Sugarbowl	3:33
2.	"Breeze" (Inst.)		3:33
Total length:			7:06

=== Season 3 ===
Part 1-2

Part 1

Released on September 23, 2018
No.	Title	Artist	Length
1.	"Perfect"	10cm	3:57
2.	"Perfect" (Inst.)		3:57
Total length:			7:54

Part 2

Released on October 11, 2018
No.	Title	Artist	Length
1.	"To You"	Kim Min-seok (MeloMance)	3:31
2.	"Hey" (Acoustic Ver.)	Kim Woo-seok	4:09
3.	"Hey"	Paul Kim	3:28
4.	"To You"	Kim Min-seok (MeloMance)	3:04
5.	"To You" (Inst.)		3:31
6.	"Hey" (Acoustic Ver. Inst.)		4:09

=== Season 4 ===
Part 1-2

Part 1

Released on July 17, 2019
No.	Title	Artist	Length
1.	"Be My Love"	Exo-CBX	3:35
2.	"Be My Love" (Inst.)		3:35
Total length:			7:10

Part 2

Released on August 3, 2020
No.	Title	Artist	Length
1.	"Hibye"	Suran	3:19
2.	"Hibye" (Inst.)		3:19
Total length:			6:38

== Viewership ==
By the conclusion of the second season, the series had earned 100 million views.

The fourth season earned 30 million views after its last episode was released in the summer of 2019.
