= SM Station Season 1 =

Compilation album by SM Station
- Released: April 6, 2017
- Recorded: February 2016–February 2017
- Studios: Antenna (Seoul); BrickWall Sound (Seoul); Doobdoob (Seoul); FeelGhood (Seoul); Hi-Lite (Seoul); IAB (Seoul); InGrid (Seoul); JYPE (Seoul); Lead Sound (Seoul); Mecha (Seoul); Mojo (Seoul); MonoTree (Seoul); Seokyeong University (Seoul); Root Lab; Santa (Seoul); Seoul; SM Blue Ocean (Seoul); SM Booming System (Seoul); SM LVYIN (Seoul); SM Yellow Tail (Seoul); Sound Pool (Seoul); Sound Story (Seoul); Studio-T (Seoul); The Vibe (Seoul); Tone (Seoul); Yireh (Seoul)
- Genres: K-pop; classical; EDM; jazz; R&B; heavy metal
- Length: 215:06
- Languages: Korean; Mandarin; English
- Labels: SM; KT Music
- Producers: Lee Soo-man; 250; BeatBurger; Cha Gil-wan; David Amber; Delly Boi; Douglas James; Hitchhiker; Joshua Elia Williams; Jung Goo-hyun; Kenzie; Kevin Writer; Kim Jin-hwan; Kim Jung-mo; LDN Noise; Marco; Matthew Tishler; Park Jin-young; Phil Cook; Ricky Hanley; Ryu Jae-hyun; Sermstyle; Simon Petrén; The Stereotypes; Tim Bergling; Toyo; VO3E; Yoo Han-jin; Yoo Young-jin; ZigZag Note

SM Station chronology
SM Station Season 1 (2017)	SM Station Season 2 (2017)

SM Station Season 1 is a compilation album recorded by various artists under SM Entertainment and outside the agency. The compilation album contains 52 songs and five bonus tracks recorded during the first season of SM Station, a digital music project. The album was released physically by SM Entertainment and distributed by KT Music on April 6, 2017, while the tracks that were already released are available to be downloaded digitally. It contains songs recorded throughout the course of Season 1 which spans from February 3, 2016, to February 3, 2017.

== Background ==
On January 27, 2016, SM Entertainment founder Lee Soo-man revealed the company's new projects for Hallyu wave during an SMTown event where he formally established new boy band NCT and formed a digital musical channel called SM Station where SM artists will release digital tracks every Friday. He envisioned various artists, songwriters, and producers to collaborate with SM artists for this platform. On the same day, it was revealed that Girls' Generation's Taeyeon would be the first to release a material by dropping a teaser video for "Rain." On March 30, 2017, SM Entertainment announced that all the songs from the first season will be compiled into an album scheduled to be released on April 6. The album featured all the 52 songs with five additional bonus tracks, a photobook, and a behind-the-scenes cuts of the participating artists.

== Composition ==
=== Disc one ===
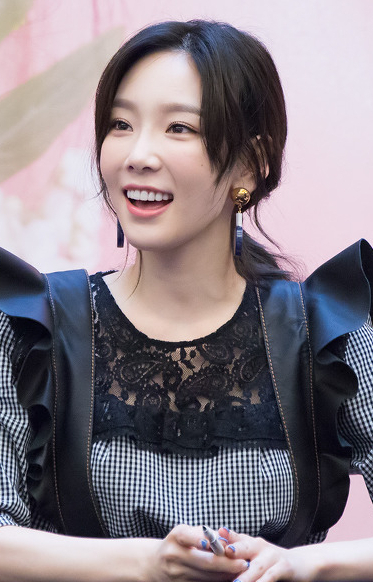
Taeyeon is the first artist to release a Station song

On February 3, Taeyeon officially released "Rain", a jazz-R&B song and the first under Station banner. On February 19, D.O. and SM's in-house record producer Yoo Young-jin released an R&B song "Tell Me (What Is Love)", a reworked version of the original song that previously appeared in Exo's first live album. Yoon Mi-rae became the first non-SM artist to release a Station track by releasing ballad song "Because of You" on February 26, with collaborations from Kenzie and Matthew Tishler.

On March 4, Eric Nam and Red Velvet's Wendy released an acoustic song "Spring Love." Yoona and 10cm released "Deoksugung Stonewall Walkway" on March 11. Jonghyun and vocal quintet Heritage released an acoustic pop song "Your Voice" on March 18. Amber released an English synth hip-hop song "Borders" on March 25, where she actively participated in the song's lyrics, music, and arrangements.

On April 1, Station had its first classical release through the release of "Regrets and Resolutions" by pianist Moon Jung-jae and flutist Kim Il-ji. The song itself was a cover of the original by Gary Schocker which was released in 2014. On April 8, Chen, Heize, and Vibe released dance-funk song "Lil' Something". Medium-tempo rock-ballad "Narcissus" was released on April 15 by M&D featuring Wheein from Mamamoo. M&D members Heechul participated in penning the lyrics while Jungmo composed, arranged, and produced the song. The next Friday, Kim Bum-soo and Kenzie released Latin pop song "Pain Poem", in which the latter were responsible for the production. The Station released "Mindjack" on April 29, the first heavy metal instrumental for the project. It was recorded by progressive metal band Inlayer. The first CD concludes with "Wave", a progressive house song released on May 6 by R3hab featuring f(x) members Amber and Luna, and Xavi&Gi.

=== Disc two ===
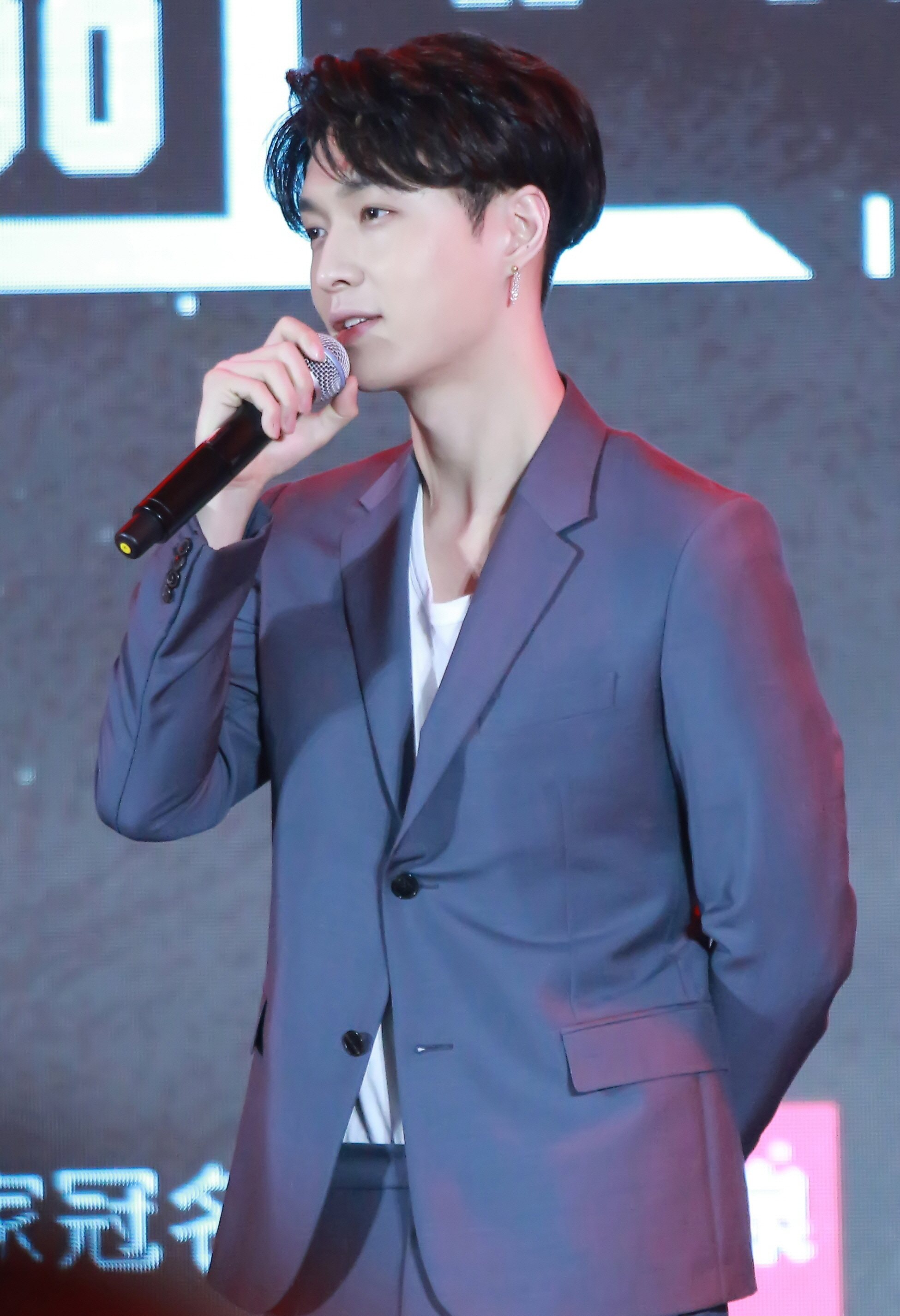
Lay (pictured in 2017) made his solo debut through "Monodrama" and the song itself is the first Mandarin track in the project

The second disc begins with "The Day", a folk ballad song performed by K.Will and Baekhyun which was released on May 13. The song expressed regret and longing for a past love. On May 20, Dana released "Touch You", a sentimental ballad song with its lyrics narrating honest message about music and dreams. Lay made his solo debut through the release of "Monodrama" on May 27, where he actively took part in the production of the song. The song fell under R&B genre and was the first Station release in Mandarin.

On June 3, comedians Kim Sook and Yoon Jung-soo released "You're the Boss", the first trot song on the digital project. Tiffany and rapper Simon Dominic released "Heartbreak Hotel" on June 10. The track featured Tifanny's vocal and Dominic's rap as they capture the feelings of an old couple in the process of breaking up. BoA and Beenzino released house song "No Matter What" on June 17. Both BoA and Beenzino wrote the lyrics of the song, conveying the desire to be with a lover together in any kind of situation. The last Station material for the month of June came with the release of "Definition of Love" by Lee Dong-woo and Swedish musician and songwriter Orphée Noah on June 24. The song is the first neo soul-jazz song of the project and was written, composed, and arranged by Noah himself.

On July 1, Cho Yeon-su, Kassy, Leeteuk, and Suho released "My Hero" in the eve of the 2016 Summer Olympics in Rio de Janeiro, Brazil. The lyrics expressed hope that the struggles, the sweat, and tears by the South Korean athletes will serve as a foundation for victory. The proceeds of the song was donated to the Korea National Athletes Association. On July 8, J-Min and Sim Eun-jee released acoustic ballad, "Way Back Home". The song was entirely written, composed, and arranged by Sim. The music video features Red Velvet's Yeri. On July 15, Cha Ji-yeon teamed up LDN Noise to release "My Show", Cha's first EDM song. It is described as a cheerful song to get out of the summer heat. On July 22, f(x) released "All Mine", an EDM song that remains the group's last Korean single as a quartet to date. NCT 127 partnered with Coca-Cola to release the Korean version of "Taste the Feeling" on July 29. The second disc concludes with Girls' Generation's "Sailing (0805)" which was released on August 5 to celebrate the group's ninth anniversary.

=== Disc three ===
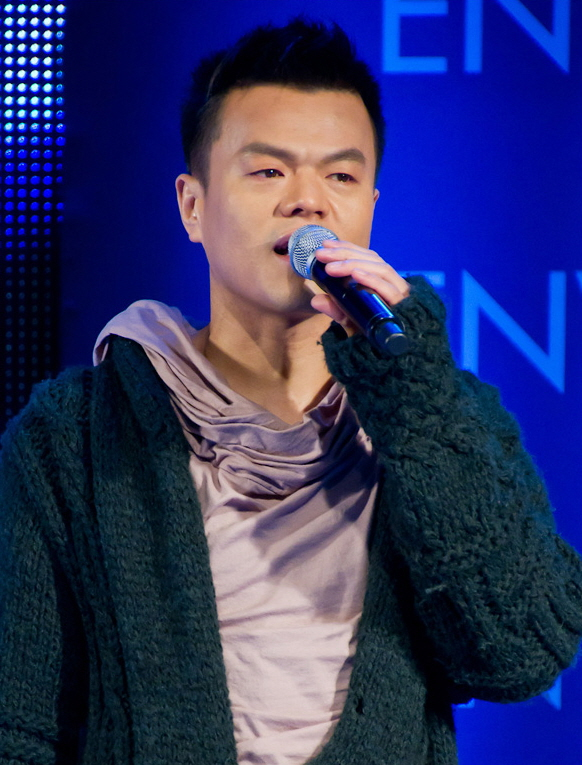
Park Jin-young, the founder of JYP Entertainment is featured on "Born to be Wild"

"Starry Night" by Lee Jin-ah and Onew is the opening track for the third disc. This jazz-pop song accompanied with its fairytale-like message was released on August 12. On August 18, Seohyun and Yuri collaborated with Pantene, as they released "Secret", a dance-pop song with a focus on its strong drum and bass. On August 26, Kim Hyo-yeon, Jo Kwon, Min, and Park Jin-young released "Born to be Wild". Jo stated that it is great to have SM and JYP collaborating.

Hitchhiker released EDM song "$10" on September 2. The song was entirely composed by Hitchhiker himself. On September 9, DJ 250 released a remixed version of BoA's "Pit-A-Pat". This particular song was created in collaboration between SM and Beasts & Natives (BANA). On September 17, Exo and Yoo Jae-suk released dance-pop song "Dancing King". The song is released for the latter's series, Infinite Challenge and the proceeds were donated to charity. On September 23, Bada and Ryeowook released "Cosmic", a pop song with a mysterious and dreamy atmosphere.

The first release for October is "Heartbeat" by Amber and Luna featuring Ferry Corsten and Kago Pengchi. The electro-trance song was released on October 2 during the Spectrum Dance Music Festival. On October 7, Alesso and Chen released the Korean version of "Years", an emotional piano melody with a beat drum sound. On October 14, Henry Lau and Soyou released "Runnin'", an R&B song that compares the excitement between a man and a woman by comparing it to coffee. Henry is involved in penning and compsoing the track alongside American production team The Stereotypes and Brother Su. On October 19, BeatBurger and BoA released "Music is Wonderful", a progressive EDM song which BoA herself wrote and composed. The song was originally released on October 1 during the Spectrum Dance Music Festival. The last release for October is "Nightmare" on October 28 by rocker Yoon Do-hyun, rappers Reddy and G2, and SM Rookie Johnny who appears as the DJ. The song is described as an experimental crossover between hip-hop and heavy metal as it interprets the words "villain" and "nightmare."

== Track listing ==
SM Station Season 1 track listing – Disc 1
No.	Title	Lyrics	Music	Arrangement	Length
1.	"Rain" (Taeyeon)	Lee Yoo-jin; Mafly; Bong Eun-yeong	Matthew Tishler; Aaron Benward; Felicia Barton; Olivia Holt	Matthew Tishler	3:42
2.	"Tell Me (What Is Love)" (D.O. and Yoo Young-jin)	Yoo Young-jin	Yoo Young-jin	Yoo Young-jin	4:42
3.	"Because of You" (Yoon Mi-rae)	Kenzie	Matthew Tishler; Aaron Benward; Felicia Barton	Matthew Tishler; Park In-young	3:30
4.	"Spring Love" (봄인가 봐; Bominga bwa; 'I guess it's spring' (Eric Nam and Wendy)	Shin Agnes; Hwang Hyun	Kevin Writer; Douglas James	Kevin Writer; Douglas James; Hwang Hyun	3:18
5.	"Deoksugung Stonewall Walkway" (덕수궁 돌담길의 봄; Deoksugung doldamgirui bom; 'Spring on Deoksugung Stone Wall Road' (Yoona and 10cm))	Kwon Jeong-yeol; Marco	Marco	Marco	3:16
6.	"Your Voice" (한마디; Hanmadi; 'One word' (Heritage and Jonghyun))	Kim Jong-hyun; Park Hee-young; Ha Hyeong-ju; Lee Hwa	Kim Jong-hyun; Park Hee-young; Ha Hyeong-ju; Lee Hwa	Heritage	4:21
7.	"Borders" (Amber)	PIT300; Kim Tae-hyung; VO3E; Amber Liu	Amber Liu; VO3E	Amber Liu; VO3E	3:52
8.	"Regrets and Resolutions" (Kim Il-ji and Moon Jung-jae)		Gary Schocker		8:01
9.	"Lil' Something" (썸타; Sseomta; 'Sometime' (Chen, Heize and Vibe))	Ryu Jae-hyun; Jang Da-hye	Ryu Jae-hyun	Ryu Jae-hyun	3:20
10.	"Narcissus" (나르시스; Nareusiseu (M&D and Wheein))	Kim Hee-chul	Kim Jung-mo	Kim Jung-mo	3:41
11.	"Pain Poem" (서툰 시; 'Clumsy poetry' (Kim Bum-soo and Kenzie))	Kenzie	Kenzie	Kenzie	4:13
12.	"Mindjack" (Inlayer)		Inlayer	Inlayer	4:00
13.	"Wave" (R3hab, Luna, Amber, and Xavi&Gi)	Lee Seu-ran	Fadil El Ghoul; Daphne Khoo; Charlie Snyder; Xavi & Gi	Fadil El Ghoul	3:03
Total length:					52:59

SM Station Season 1 track listing – Disc 2
No.	Title	Lyrics	Music	Arrangement	Length
1.	"The Day" (K.Will and Baekhyun)	Kim Jae-hyung; Miss Kay	Kim Jae-hyung; Miss Kay	Kim Jae-hyung; Miss Kay	3:50
2.	"Touch You" (울려 퍼져라; Ullyeo peojeora; 'Let it ring out' (Dana))	Kim Jin-hwan	Kim Jin-hwan	Kim Jin-hwan	5:24
3.	"Monodrama" ((独角戏) (모노드라마; Monodeurama) (Lay))	CC; Zhang Yixing	Devine Channel; Zhang Yixing	Devine Channel; Zhang Yixing	4:05
4.	"You're the Boss" (너만 잘났냐; Neoman jallannya; 'Are you the only one who thinks you're good?' (Kim Sook and Yoon Jung-soo))	Hong Young-hwan; Kim Sook	Hong Young-hwan	Hong Young-hwan	3:53
5.	"Heartbreak Hotel" (Tiffany and Simon Dominic)	Jung Ki-seok; Shin Agnes	Andrew Choi; Harvey Mason Jr.; Britt Burton; Lily Elise; Orlando tha Great; Chaz Jackson	Andrew Choi; Harvey Mason Jr.; Britt Burton; Lily Elise; Orlando tha Great; Chaz Jackson; Gray	4:24
6.	"No Matter What" (BoA and Beenzino)	Lim Sung-bin; Kwon Bo-ah	Hayley Aitken; Sebastian Lundberg; Fredrik Häggstam; Johan Gustafson	Hayley Aitken; Sebastian Lundberg; Fredrik Häggstam; Johan Gustafson; Imlay	3:05
7.	"Definition of Love" (Lee Dong-woo and Orphée Noah)	Orphée Noah	Orphée Noah	Orphée Noah	3:40
8.	"My Hero" (나의 영웅; Naui yeongung (Cho Yeong-su, Kassy, Leeteuk and Suho))	Conan; Han Su-ji; Jo Young-soo	Lee Yun-jin; Jo Young-soo	DK Choo	4:01
9.	"Way Back Home" (집 앞에서; Jip apeseo; 'In front of the house' (J-Min))	Sim Eun-jee	Sim Eun-jee	Sim Eun-jee	4:30
10.	"My Show" (Cha Ji-yeon and LDN Noise)	Jo Yoon-kyung	LDN Noise; Adrian McKinnon; Dyson	LDN Noise	3:16
11.	"All Mine" (f(x))	Kim Min-jung; Lee Seu-ran	Andre Merritt; Breana Marin; LDN Noise	LDN Noise	3:23
12.	"Taste the Feeling" (NCT 127)	D'Day	Josh Hanalei Jones; Jeremy Bircher; Scott Charles Fritz	Space Camp	2:50
13.	"Sailing (0805)" (그 여름; Geu yeoreum; 'That summer' (Girls' Generation))	Choi Soo-young	Jang Jeon-seok; Simon Janlöv; Yoon Jong-sung; Sophiya	Park Asel	4:20
Total length:					50:41

SM Station Season 1 track listing – Disc 3
No.	Title	Lyrics	Music	Arrangement	Length
1.	"Starry Night" (밤과 별의 노래; Bamgwa byeorui norae; 'Song of the Night and the Stars' (Onew and Lee Jin-ah))	You Hee-yeol; Lee Jin-ah	Andreas Öberg; Lee Jin-ah; Simon Petrén	Andreas Öberg; Lee Jin-ah; Simon Petrén	4:00
2.	"Secret" (Seohyun and Yuri)	Jo Yoon-kyung	LDN Noise; Caroline Gustavsson; Carolyn Jordan	LDN Noise	3:48
3.	"Born to be Wild" (Hyoyeon, Jo Kwon, Min, and Park Jin-young)	Park Jin-young	Park Jin-young; Toyo	Park Jin-young; Toyo	3:35
4.	"$10" (Hitchhiker)	Kim Boo-min	Choi Jin-woo	Choi Jin-woo	3:11
5.	"Pit-a-Pat (250 remix)" (두근두근; Dugeundugeun; 'Heart pounding' (Onew and Lee Jin-ah))	Park Chang-hyun	Park Chang-hyun	250	3:53
6.	"Dancing King" (Yoo Jae-suk and Exo)	Jang Yeo-jin; JQ	Peter Tambakis; Sermstyle; MZMC; Otha "Vakseen" Davis III; Phil Cook	Sermstyle; Phil Cook	4:04
7.	"Cosmic" (Bada and Ryeowook)	Jo Yoon-kyung	Delly Boi; Sophiya	Delly Boi; Sophiya	4:12
8.	"Heartbeat" (Amber, Luna, Kago Pengchi, and Ferry Corsten)	Kenzie	Ferry Corsten; Kago Pengchi; Phoebe Sharp; Todd Wright	Ferry Corsten; Kago Pengchi; Ross Lara	3:26
9.	"Years" (Alesso and Chen)	Hwang Ji-won	Sam Watters; Matthew Koma; Alesso	Alesso	3:15
10.	"Runnin'" (우리 둘; Uri dul; 'The two of us' (Henry and Soyou))	Say; Soyou; Henry Lau	Henry Lau; The Stereotypes; Micahfonecheck	Kim Ji-soo	3:36
11.	"Music is Wonderful" (Beatburger and BoA)	Jae Shim-won; Greg Hwang; Kwon Bo-ah	Beatburger; Kwon Bo-ah	Beatburger; J.Williams	3:56
12.	"Nightmare" (Yoon Do-hyun, Reddy, G2, Inlayer, Johnny)	David Choi; King Hong-woo; Kevin Hwang	David Choi; Yang Jin-hyun	David Choi; Yang Jin-hyun	3:49
13.	"Always in My Heart" (이별을 배웠어; Ibyeoreul baewosseo; 'I learned to break up' (Joy and Seulong))	Lee Dae-hee; Kim Ki-wook	ZigZag Not; Children Playing	ZigZag Not; Children Playing	3:23
Total length:					40:08

SM Station Season 1 track listing – Disc 4
No.	Title	Lyrics	Music	Arrangement	Length
1.	"Still" (보여; Boyeo; 'Show me' (Kim Tae-hyun and Sunday))	Kim Tae-hyun	Jung Goo-hyun	Joong Goo-hyun	3:38
2.	"Sweet Dream" (Universe Cowards)	Kim Hee-chul	Lee Sang-jun; Cha Gil-wan	Cha Gil-wan	4:34
3.	"Love [story]" (S.E.S.)	Yoo Young-jin	Yoo Young-jin	Yoo Young-jin; Yoo Han-jin	3:59
4.	"Mystery" (Hyoyeon)	JQ; Jo Yoon-kyung; Lee Seu-ran; MQ	David Amber; Devyn Rush	David Amber	3:02
5.	"Inspiration" (Jonghyun)	Kim Jong-hyun	Kim Jong-hyun; Imlay	Kim Jong-hyun; Imlay	3:37
6.	"It's You" (그대라서; Geudaeraseo; 'Because it's you' (Luna and Shin Yong-jae))	Yeon Kyoo-seong	Yeon Kyoo-seong	Yeon Kyoo-seong	4:02
7.	"Have Yourself a Merry Little Christmas" (Wendy, Moon Jung-jae, and Nile Lee)	Ralph Blane	Hugh Martin	Nile Lee	4:51
8.	"Sound of Your Heart" (너의 목소리; Neoui moksori; 'Your voice' (SM Town and Steve Barakatt))	January 8th	David Simon; Ricky Hanley	David Simon; Ricky Hanley	4:01
9.	"Road" (길; Gil (TraxX))	Seo Jung	Kim Jung-mo	Kim Jung-mo	3:59
10.	"Sparks Fly" (Yoon Do-hyun)	Hyun Ji-won; JQ	Shelley Harland; Kat Vinter; Jon Green	Shelley Harland; Kat Vinter; Jon Green	3:46
11.	"Darling U" (Seulgi and Yesung)	Lee Hyuk-jae; Kim Jong-woon	Kim Jong-woon; Choi Hee-joon; Hwang Seung-chan	Cloud	3:09
12.	"When My Loneliness Comes Out to You" (나의 외로움이 널 부를 때; Naui oeroumi neol bureul ttae; 'When my loneliness calls you' (Punch))	Jo Dong-hee	Jo Dong-ik	Kim Jin-hwan	5:09
13.	"Curtain" (커튼; Keoteun (Suho and Song Young-joo))	Leonalion	Leonalion	Leonalion	4:17
14.	"Secret" (Bonus track) (Taeyeon))	Mafly	Kei Lim; Ryan Kim; Aurora Pfeiffer; Tyler Shamy; Thaddeus Dixon; Kiana Ledé	Thaddeus Nixon	3:37
15.	"Wave (Xavi&Gi Version)" (Bonus track (Luna, Amber, and Xavi&Gi))	Lee Seu-ran	Fadil El Ghoul; Daphne Khoo; Charlie Snyder; Xavi & Gi	Xavi&Gi	3:48
16.	"Heartbeat" (English Version) (Bonus track) (Amber, Luna, Kago Pengchi, and Ferry Corsten))	Todd Wright; Phoebe Wright	Todd Wright, Phoebe Sharp; Kago Pengchi; Ferry Corsten	Ferry Corsten; Kago Pengchi; Ross Lara	3:26
17.	"Years" (Chinese Version) (Bonus track) (Alesso and Chen))	Hwang Ji-won	Sam Watters; Matthew Koma; Alesso	Alesso	3:14
18.	"When My Loneliness Comes Out to You" (Original Soundtrack Version) (Bonus track) 나의 외로움이 널 부를 때; Naui oeroumi neol bureul ttae; 'When my loneliness calls you'(Punch))	Jo Dong-hee	Jo Dong-ik	Kim Jin-hwan	5:09
Total length:					71:18

== Chart ==
=== Weekly chart ===
Weekly chart performance for SM Station Season 1
Chart (2017)	Peak position
South Korean Albums (Gaon)	11

== Release history ==
Region	Date	Format	Label
South Korea	April 6, 2017	CD	SM; KT Music
