= J (album) =

- Digital cover

Studio album by Jaehyun
- Released: August 26, 2024
- Studios: Doobdoob (Seoul); SM Aube (Seoul); SM Dorii (Seoul); SM Yellow Tail (Seoul); Sound Pool (Seoul)
- Genre: R&B
- Length: 24:46
- Languages: Korean; English
- Labels: SM; Kakao

Singles from J
- 1. "Roses" Released: August 12, 2024; 2. "Dandelion" Released: August 12, 2024; 3. "Smoke" Released: August 26, 2024

J is the debut studio album by South Korean singer Jaehyun. It was released on August 26, 2024, by SM Entertainment through Kakao Entertainment, and contained eight tracks. The album marked Jaehyun as the fourth NCT member to make an official solo debut.

== Background ==
On August 8, 2024, SM Entertainment announced the solo debut of Jaehyun through a video trailer titled "The Smoky Night", revealing that the album consists of eight tracks along with the Korean and English versions of the title track "Smoke". On the same day, the album was available for pre-order at various online and offline music stores and also announced that two singles "Roses" and "Dandelion" would be pre-released on August 12, ahead of his debut. The next day, SM posted the scheduler of the album and revealed various teaser content such as the music videos of the tracks, teaser images, and concept films.

== Release and promotion ==
J was released worldwide on August 26, 2024, by SM and Kakao.

Ahead of Jaehyun's debut, he sang the pre-release single "Dandelion" at the 2024 Seoul Jazz Festival with Lauv. On August 19, 2024, Jaehyun announced that he would be holding a listening party titled "Jaehyun Vol.1" to commemorate the release of his first solo album on the day of his solo debut and it would be divided into five parts starting from 12:00 to 18:00 (KST). In addition, it featured three flavors of drinks that Jaehyun created to match the album concept and the contents of the preparation for the listening party would be released on August 22, through NCT's YouTube channel.

== Track listing ==
J track listing
No.	Title	Lyrics	Music	Arrangement	Length
1.	"Smoke"	Jaehyun; Wutan	Marcus Lomax; Tatu; Jorgen Odegard	Odegard; Xela	2:49
2.	"Roses"	Jaehyun; Taneisha Jackson; Morgan Connie Smith; Shakka Philip; Charlotte Wilson; Hyun	Jaehyun; Bhavik Pattani; Jackson; Smith; Philip; Wilson; Hyun	808Hav808	2:48
3.	"Flamin' Hot Lemon"	Jaehyun; Azad Naficy; Yonatan "xsdtrk" Ayal	Jaehyun; Naficy; Ayal	Naficy; Ayal	2:48
4.	"Dandelion"	Jaehyun	Gabe Reali; Jackson Hirsh; Ryan Raines	Raines; Rence	2:30
5.	"Completely"	Nick Bradley	Bradley; Jez Ashurst	Bradley	3:37
6.	"Easy"	Jaehyun; Kang Eun-jeong; Anthony Watts; Tone Stith; Delilah Contreras; Tyler Holmes; Brandon "B Ham" Hamlin	Watts; Stith; Contreras; Holmes; Hamlin	B Ham	3:14
7.	"Can't Get You"	Jaehyun	Antonio Dixon; Patrick "J.Que" Smith; Kenny 'Babyface' Edmonds	Dixon; Smith	4:11
8.	"Smoke" (English version)	Lomax; Tatu; Odegard	Lomax; Tatu; Odegard	Odegard; Xela	2:49
Total length:					24:46

== Charts ==
=== Weekly charts ===
Weekly chart performance for J
Chart (2024)	Peak position
Hungarian Physical Albums (MAHASZ)	35
Japanese Albums (Oricon)	7
Japanese Combined Albums (Oricon)	8
Japanese Hot Albums (Billboard Japan)	7
South Korean Albums (Circle)	3
US Heatseekers Albums (Billboard)	11
US Top Albums Sales (Billboard)	18

=== Monthly charts ===
Monthly chart performance for J
Chart (2024)	Position
Japanese Albums (Oricon)	25
South Korean Albums (Circle)	4

=== Year-end charts ===
Year-end chart performance for J
Chart (2024)	Position
South Korean Albums (Circle)	68

== Certifications ==
Certifications for J
Region	Certification	Certified units/sales
South Korea (KMCA)	Platinum	250,000^{^}
^{^} Shipments figures based on certification alone.

== Release history ==
Release history for J
Region	Date	Format	Label
South Korea	August 26, 2024	CD	SM; Kakao
Various	August 26, 2024	Digital download; streaming	SM; Kakao
