= SM Station =

Music project

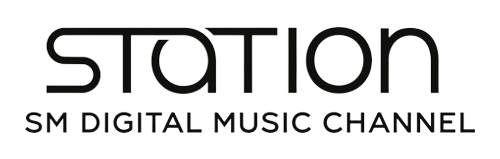
- Type of project: Music
- Owner: SM Entertainment
- Country: South Korea
- Established: February 3, 2016
- Website: smtown.com/production/sm-station

SM Station is a digital music project by South Korean record label SM Entertainment. It undertook to release one digital single every Friday starting from February 3, 2016. The project's first season ended on February 3, 2017, with 52 songs. Its second season began on March 31, 2017, and concluded on April 6, 2018, with a total of 57 songs. In 2022, it introduced NCT Lab, a sub-project dedicated to individual projects for NCT members.

== History ==
SM Station's purpose was to showcase SM Entertainment's artists and producers, while also including collaborations with artists outside of the label. The project began on February 3, 2016, with the release of its first single "Rain" by Taeyeon. The song proved successful, topping the South Korean Gaon Digital Chart and winning first place on the weekly music show Inkigayo. Subsequent singles that entered top 10 on the Gaon Digital Chart include "Spring Love" by Wendy and Eric Nam, "The Day" by Baekhyun and K.Will, "No Matter What" by BoA and Beenzino, "Dancing King" by Exo and Yoo Jae-suk, "Always in My Heart" by Joy and Seulong, and "Sweet Dream" by Kim Hee-chul and Min Kyung-hoon. "Rain" and "Spring Love" received various nominations at year-end music awards, among which "Rain" won a Digital Bonsang at the 31st Golden Disk Awards and "Sweet Dream" won a Best Rock Song at the MelOn Music Awards. The first season ended on February 3, 2017, with the 52nd single "Curtain" by Suho.

Station's second season was to feature collaborations with foreign musicians, besides past projects. It began on March 31, 2017, with the first single "Would U" by Red Velvet. On April 6, 2017, SM Entertainment released a compilation album titled SM Station Season 1 which contains the first season's 52 singles and five bonus tracks. The second season concluded on April 6, 2018, with "New Heroes" by NCT member Ten.

In August 2018, SM Entertainment announced a special season titled Station X 0 (Station Young), in collaboration with SK Telecom's "0 (Young)" mobile brand. (Note: SK Telecom is the parent company of Dreamus Company (formerly IRIVER), the official distributor of SM Entertainment's releases from 2018 to 2023. Station X 0 was also a part of youth-aimed campaigns for the official launching of the "0 (Young)" brand in the same year.) According to the label, Station X 0 is a cultural project for the young generation. The season ended on October 19, 2018, with "Written in the Stars" by Wendy and John Legend. A project girl group, Station Young, consisting of Red Velvet's Seulgi, (G)I-dle's Soyeon, GFriend's SinB and soloist Chungha was formed for the single "Wow Thing" for the album.

A third season was announced in November 2018. The first single would be released by Lucas and Jonah Nilsson of Swedish band Dirty Loops. The season ended with "Long Flight" by Taeyong, released on July 18, 2019.

On November 15, 2019, SM Entertainment uploaded a trailer featuring Jaehyun, announcing the fourth season titled Station X. The season began on November 20 with a collaboration single with UNICEF "This is Your Day (for every child, UNICEF)", by BoA, Siwon, J-Min, Sunny, Taemin, Suho, Wendy, and Doyoung.

On July 27, 2020, SM Entertainment announced a special project titled Our Beloved BoA featuring covers of BoA's top hits to commemorate the 20th anniversary of her debut. It began on July 31, with the first single "Garden in the Air" by Baekhyun, from BoA's fifth Korean studio album Girls on Top.

=== NCT Lab ===
On January 28, 2022, SM Entertainment announced a special project titled NCT Lab, which will feature solo or unit songs made by NCT members. It began on February 4, with the release of Mark's first single, "Child". The second single, "Conextion (Age of Light)", sung by Doyoung, Mark and Haechan, was released on March 20 as a collaboration with the Ministry of Culture, Sports and Tourism and the Korea Creative Content Agency, who used it as the theme song for their "Gwanghwa Era" project. It features modern instruments and traditional Korean instruments including the gayageum, janggu, taepyeongso and gong. The performance video features Shotaro as a dancer. As of July 2023, there have been a total of six singles released under NCT Lab, including "Forever Only" by Jaehyun, "Birthday" by Ten, "Rain Day" by Kun, Taeil, and Yangyang, and "Golden Hour" by Mark.

In August 2023, it was announced that NCT Lab would continue as a separate project from SM Station. It began with a solo single by Jaehyun titled "Horizon", released on August 8.

== Discography ==
Seasons

- SM Station Season 1 (2016–2017)
- SM Station Season 2 (2017–2018)
- SM Station X 0 (2018)
- SM Station Season 3 (2018–2019)
- SM Station X 4 LOVEs for Winter (2019)
- SM Station Season 4 (2020–2023)
- Our Beloved BoA (2020)
- MV Remastering Project (2021–2023)
- NCT Lab (2022–2023)

== Awards and nominations ==
The name of the award ceremony, year presented, award category, nominee(s), artist(s), and the result of the award
Award ceremony	Year	Category	Nominee / work	Artist	Result	Ref.
Gaon Chart K-Pop Awards	2017	Song of the Year - February	"Rain"	Taeyeon	Nominated	
Gaon Chart K-Pop Awards	2017	Song of the Year - September	"Dancing King"	Yoo Jae-suk and EXO	Nominated	
Gaon Chart K-Pop Awards	2017	Song of the Year - November	"Sweet Dream"	Kim Hee-chul and Min Kyung-hoon	Nominated	
Golden Disc Awards	2017	Digital Bonsang Award	"Rain"	Taeyeon	Won	
Korean Music Awards	2017	Best Dance and Electronic Song Award	"$10"	Hitchhiker	Won	
MelOn Music Awards	2016	Best Ballad Song	"Rain"	Taeyeon	Nominated	
MelOn Music Awards	2016	Song of the Year	"Rain"	Taeyeon	Nominated	
MelOn Music Awards	2017	Best Rock Song	"Sweet Dream"	Kim Hee-chul and Min Kyung-hoon	Won	
Mnet Asian Music Awards	2016	Best Vocal Performance Female Solo	"Rain"	Taeyeon	Nominated	
Mnet Asian Music Awards	2016	HotelsCombined Song of the Year	"Rain"	Taeyeon	Nominated	
Mnet Asian Music Awards	2016	HotelsCombined Song of the Year	"Spring Love"	Eric Nam and Wendy	Nominated	
Mnet Asian Music Awards	2016	Best Collaboration	"Spring Love"	Eric Nam and Wendy	Nominated	
Mnet Asian Music Awards	2016	Best Collaboration	"No Matter What"	BoA and Beenzino	Nominated	

== Concert shows ==
- "The Station" (2018), a music talk concert with various artists from SM '#STATION'....
