= Jaehyun =

South Korean singer and actor (born 1997)

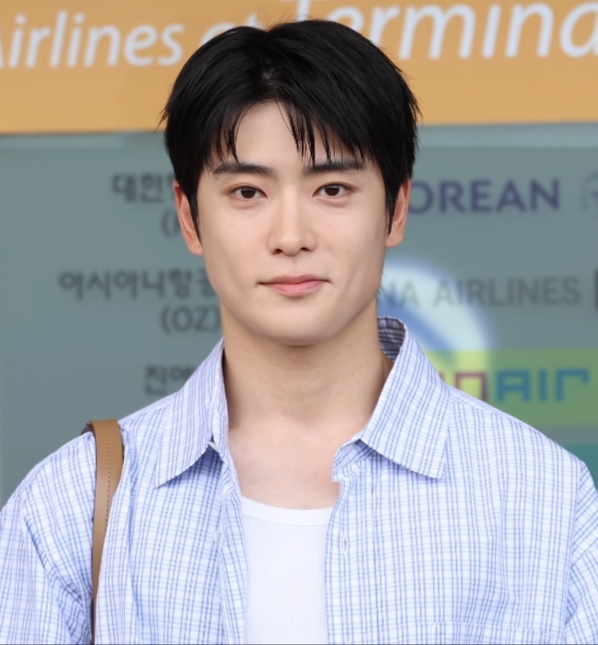
- Jaehyun in 2026
- Born: Jeong Jae-hyun; February 14, 1997 (age 29); Seoul, South Korea
- Other name: Jeong Yun-o
- Occupations: Singer; songwriter; actor
- Years active: 2013–present
- Musical career
- Genres: K-pop; R&B
- Instrument: Vocals
- Label: SM
- Member of: NCT; NCT 127; NCT DoJaeJung
- Formerly of: SM Rookies

Korean name
- Hangul: 정윤오
- RR: Jeong Yuno
- MR: Chŏng Yuno

Birth name
- Hangul: 정재현
- RR: Jeong Jaehyeon
- MR: Chŏng Chaehyŏn

Jeong Yun-o (Korean: 정윤오; born Jeong Jae-hyun (정재현), February 14, 1997), known professionally as Jaehyun, is a South Korean singer, songwriter, and actor. He rose to prominence as a member of the K-pop boy band NCT and its sub-units NCT 127 and NCT DoJaeJung.

Born in Seoul and raised between South Korea and the United States, Jaehyun started training under SM Entertainment in 2012 and began his career in 2013 as part of the label's official team of trainees, SM Rookies, appearing on television and touring both in South Korea and abroad. He made his debut in 2016 with NCT, which went on to achieve commercial success and become an influential K-pop act. Following the release of his first standalone singles, "Forever Only" (2022) and "Horizon" (2023), Jaehyun's debut studio album, the R&B record J (2024), reached number three on the Circle Album Chart and sold over 450,000 copies in South Korea, with its lead single, "Smoke", marking his first top-five entry on the Circle Digital Chart.

On television, Jaehyun hosted the music program Inkigayo from 2019 to 2021 and first ventured into acting with a leading role in the college romance series Dear.M (2022). He made his film debut in the mystery thriller You Will Die in 6 Hours (2024). Jaehyun has also served as a global ambassador for the Italian fashion house Prada since 2022.

== Life and career ==
=== 1997–2012: Early life and musical beginnings ===
Jaehyun was born on February 14, 1997, in Seocho District, Seoul, South Korea. Although he was born with the name Jeong Jae-hyun (정재현), he later legally changed his name to Jeong Yun-o (정윤오). At the age of five, Jaehyun moved to Connecticut, USA with his parents, where he went by the English name Jay Jeong. As a result, he is fluent in both English and Korean. He revealed that while studying in Connecticut, he was the only Asian student at school. Jaehyun returned to South Korea at the age of ten, and said that he struggled adapting back to Korean culture.

Jaehyun trained in Taekwondo and received a Black belt. He later became interested in music at a young age due to his parents' influence; he learned to play the guitar and the piano, and eventually began singing during his middle school. His grandmother, a retired professional dancer, was also his guide during dance training. He was also inspired to pursue music by his elementary school teacher. Jaehyun attended Shindong Middle School and Apgujeong High School and later transferred to the School of Performing Arts Seoul in his second year of high school and graduated in 2016. He used to be a student council president.

=== 2013–2023: SM Rookies, NCT, and solo work ===
Jaehyun was cast by SM Entertainment in 2012, discovered by street scouts in front of his school. He auditioned with a performance of "Mama" by Exo. On December 9, 2013, he was introduced as a member of the pre-debut trainee team SM Rookies. In 2014, he participated with fellow NCT members on the show Exo 90:2014, where they performed songs from the 1990s. From January 21 to July 1, 2015, he and groupmate Doyoung were hosts of the program Show Champion. In July 2015, he and groupmate Ten both competed in Hope Basketball All-Star. In December 2015, Jaehyun performed "A Whole New World" on Disney Channel Korea's The Mickey Mouse Club.

Jaehyun at the Dream Concert in 2018

In April 2016, Jaehyun officially debuted as a member of NCT's sub-unit, NCT U, with the singles "The 7th Sense" and "Without You". On July 10, he made his debut as a member of NCT 127 with their first EP, NCT#127. In March 2017, Jaehyun joined the radio show NCT Night Night as a DJ alongside fellow member Johnny. In November 2017, Jaehyun and Dear released the song "Try Again" for the project SM Station. In December, he featured in the music video for Wendy and Baek A-yeon's "The Little Match Girl".

In October 2019, Jaehyun began hosting the music program Inkigayo, which airs every Sunday, alongside Minhyuk and Naeun. They stepped down in February 2021 after a year and four months, having become the program's longest-serving continuous group of hosts up to that point and earned praise from viewers for their energy and chemistry. In September 2020, it was announced that Jaehyun was cast in his first acting role as a university student in the college romance television series Dear.M, scheduled to air on KBS2 in the first half of 2021. However, the broadcast was postponed indefinitely following school bullying allegations against his co-star Park Hye-su. After a nearly two-year delay, Dear.M premiered between June and July 2022 through the streaming platforms U-Next in Japan and Rakuten Viki in selected regions. That same year, Jaehyun released his first standalone single, "Forever Only", on August 18 via the NCT Lab project. It received positive reviews praising Jaehyun's vocal performance and debuted at number 14 on the US Billboard World Digital Songs.

On March 9, 2023, Jaehyun was confirmed to debut alongside fellow NCT members Doyoung and Jungwoo in the new fixed sub-unit NCT DoJaeJung. They released their first extended play (EP) Perfume on April 17, 2023. On August 8, he released his second solo single "Horizon" under the now-reconstructed NCT Lab. The song is described as a romantic R&B/Soul track that Jaehyun wrote and composed. It debuted at number 38 on the Circle Digital Chart.

=== 2024–2026: J, film debut, and enlistment ===
In May 2024, it was confirmed that Jaehyun would make his solo debut in the third quarter of that year. The following month, Jaehyun joined the American singer-songwriter Lauv on stage at the Seoul Jazz Festival to perform a duet of Lauv's 2017 single "Paris in the Rain" and preview his own upcoming song "Dandelion"; Lauv had previously praised Jaehyun's viral 2019 cover of his song "I Like Me Better" (2017), which had garnered over 100 million views on YouTube. Later that August, Jaehyun announced that his first studio album, J, would be released on August 26, along with its lead single "Smoke". He had begun developing the project in December 2023 with the goal of creating a "timeless", "classic" record that incorporated elements of "unpredictability" to make it feel new while remaining relatable to listeners over time. Jaehyun recorded the album between South Korea and Los Angeles, writing it with musicians such as Babyface, J. Que, Antonio Dixon, Shakka, and Azad Naficy of Emotional Oranges.

Ahead of J's launch, Jaehyun released a digital single featuring the tracks "Roses" and "Dandelion" on August 12. He also hosted a listening event in Seoul on the day of the album's release and performed on South Korean television music programs in August and September. In South Korea, J debuted at number three on the Circle Album Chart, sold over 450,000 copies, and received a platinum certification, while "Smoke" debuted at number four on the Circle Digital Chart and topped Circle's Download and BGM charts. The album also reached number seven on the Oricon Albums Chart in Japan and number 18 on the US Top Album Sales chart. J received positive reviews praising Jaehyun's versatility and its cohesiveness, but drew some criticism for its brief length. It earned a nomination for Millions Top 10 at the 2024 Melon Music Awards.

In September 2024, SM announced that Jaehyun would hold his first concert, titled Mute, at the Olympic Handball Gymnasium in Seoul on October 26 and 27, 2024, before enlisting to fulfill his mandatory military service later that November. Both dates were sold out, and the final performance was broadcast live through Beyond Live and Weverse. On October 24, he released the single "Unconditional", an R&B and pop track driven by a funky bassline expressing unconditional feelings toward a loved one, which he debuted live at the concert. That same month, Jaehyun made his feature film debut, starring in the mystery thriller You Will Die in 6 Hours (6시간 후 너는 죽는다) alongside Park Ju-hyun and Kwak Si-yang. Based on the novel of the same name by the Japanese author Kazuaki Takano, the film follows a woman trying to prevent her own death after a man predicts that she has only six hours to live. It won the Audience Award at the 28th Bucheon International Fantastic Film Festival, ranked first in advance ticket sales for independent and art films, and was pre-sold to 76 countries.

Jaehyun served in the army's military band from November 4, 2024, to May 3, 2026. He performed the official song for the 2025 Armed Forces Day, appearing in its promotional music video. While he was enlisted, Emotional Oranges released the dance, pop, and R&B single "Call It Off" featuring Jaehyun on April 25, 2025, marking their second collaboration after "Flamin' Hot Lemon". Later that May, during the first television broadcast of Dear.M, Jaehyun's song "Look at Me" was released as part of the series's soundtrack. In August 2025, a music video for a new song, "Timeless", was released on YouTube to celebrate the first anniversary of J's release.

After his discharge, Jaehyun embarked on his first concert tour, titled Mono, visiting five cities across Asia from June to July 2026. Ticket sales for the Seoul concerts took place on May 11 and 12, with all dates quickly selling out. At the show, Jaehyun performed his own songs as well as tracks by NCT and previewed the single "99 Degrees", a sentimental ballad released on July 10 that uses 99 degrees, just below the boiling point of water, as a metaphor for discovering perfect love through imperfection. That July, over ten years after his debut, it was announced that Jaehyun had renewed his exclusive contract with SM.

=== 2027: Second album ===
Jaehyun is set to release his second studio album in the first quarter of 2027.

== Other ventures ==
=== Endorsements ===
Jaehyun began collaborating with the Italian fashion house Prada in 2021, becoming the first person to host an official live-stream of a Prada runway show via a personal social media account that September. Prada officially appointed Jaehyun as its global ambassador in June 2022, citing his strong influence across their previous collaborations. In January 2023, he became the first Korean celebrity to star in a global campaign for the brand, photographed by David Sims. Through his partnership with Prada, Jaehyun has attended numerous fashion shows in Milan and brand pop-ups, starred in fashion films, and featured in fashion magazines. The collaboration also extended into his music career: they worked together on a music video for his song "Can't Get You", and he mentioned the brand in the lyrics of "Unconditional". South Korean publications noted that items worn by Jaehyun sold out, and that his appearances at fashion shows drew large crowds, contributing in driving the attention of Korean consumers toward Prada.

In 2024, Jaehyun became the brand ambassador for the Indonesian snack brand TicTac, the South Korean cosmetics brand Clio Cosmetics, and the Thai hair care brand Go Hair. He partnered with the Anglo-French perfume house Creed in June 2026. Jaehyun has also appeared on the cover of fashion magazines wearing Givenchy and New Balance.

=== Philanthropy ===
In March 2020, Jaehyun joined an awareness campaign organized by the non-governmental organization Sports Doctors to support medical staff working during the COVID-19 pandemic. In March 2025, Jaehyun donated ₩100 million to the Hope Bridge Korea Disaster Relief Association to aid recovery efforts for the wildfires that broke out that month.

== Discography ==
- J (2024)

== Filmography ==
=== Film ===
Year	Title	Role	Ref.
2024	You Will Die in 6 Hours (6시간 후 너는 죽는다)	Jun-woo	

=== Television ===
Year	Title	Role	Notes	Ref.
2015	Show Champion	Host		
2017	Law of the Jungle	Cast member	Law of the Jungle in Fiji	
2019–2021	Inkigayo	Host		
2022	Dear.M	Cha Min-ho		

== Concerts ==
=== Concert tours ===
List of concert tours, with dates and locations
Title	Date	Venue	City	Country	Ref.
Mono	June 6, 2026	Jamsil Indoor Stadium	Seoul	South Korea	
Mono	June 7, 2026	Jamsil Indoor Stadium	Seoul	South Korea	
Mono	June 13, 2026	Studio City Event Center	Macau		
Mono	June 20, 2026	Tennis Indoor Senayan	Jakarta	Indonesia	
Mono	June 27, 2026	Thunder Dome	Bangkok	Thailand	
Mono	June 28, 2026	Thunder Dome	Bangkok	Thailand	
Mono	July 4, 2026	Taipei Music Center	Taipei	Taiwan	
Mono	July 5, 2026	Taipei Music Center	Taipei	Taiwan	

=== Concert residencies ===
List of concert residencies, with dates, location, number of shows, and performed songs
Title	Date(s)	Venue	City	Country	Shows	Performed songs	Ref.
Mute	October 26–27, 2026	Olympic Handball Gymnasium	Seoul	South Korea	2	"Roses"; "Forever Only"; "Horizon"; "Because I Love You"; "(They Long to Be) Close to You"; "Can't Take My Eyes Off You"; "Completely"; "Smoke"; "Easy"; "Flamin' Hot Lemon"; "Dandelion"; "Unconditional"; "Can't Get You"; "Try Again"	

== Accolades ==
=== Awards and nominations ===
List of awards and nominations, with name of the award, year of ceremony, recipient, category, and result of the nomination
Award	Year	Recipient	Category	Result	Ref.
Asian Pop Music Awards	2024	Jaehyun	People's Choice Award (Overseas)	8th	
Asian Pop Music Awards	2024	"Smoke"	Top 20 Songs of the Year (Overseas)	Won	
Hanteo Music Awards	2025	Jaehyun	Global Artist – Africa	Longlisted	
Hanteo Music Awards	2025	Jaehyun	Global Artist – Asia	Nominated	
Hanteo Music Awards	2025	Jaehyun	Global Artist – Europe	Longlisted	
Hanteo Music Awards	2025	Jaehyun	Global Artist – North America	Longlisted	
Hanteo Music Awards	2025	Jaehyun	Global Artist – Oceania	Nominated	
Hanteo Music Awards	2025	Jaehyun	Global Artist – South America	Longlisted	
Korea Grand Music Awards	2024	"Smoke"	Best Song 10	Nominated	
Melon Music Awards	2024	J	Millions Top 10	Nominated	

=== Listicles ===
List of listicle placements, with name of the publisher, year of listing, name of the listicle, and placement
Publisher	Year	Listicle	Placement	Ref.
Billboard	2024	K-Pop Artist 100	82nd	
