= Dear.M =

2022 South Korean television series

- Promotional poster
- Hangul: 디어엠
- RR: Dieoem
- MR: Tiŏem
- Genre: Romance drama
- Written by: Lee Seul
- Directed by: Park Jin-woo; Seo Joo-wan
- Starring: Park Hye-su; Jeong Yun-o; Roh Jeong-eui; Bae Hyun-sung; Woo Da-vi; Lee Jin-hyuk
- Music by: Jo Yoon-jung
- Country of origin: South Korea
- Original language: Korean
- No. of episodes: 12

Production
- Executive producer: Kim Sang-hui
- Producers: Park Tae-won; Jung Hae-ryong
- Camera setup: Single-camera
- Running time: 60 minutes
- Production companies: Playlist Studio; Monster Union

Original release
- Network: Viki
- Release: June 29 – July 6, 2022
- Network: KBS Joy
- Release: April 14 – May 20, 2025
- Network: KBS2
- Release: July 9 – August 14, 2025

Related
- Love Playlist

Dear.M (Korean: 디어엠) is a 2022 South Korean television series starring Park Hye-su, Jeong Jae-hyun, Roh Jeong-eui, Bae Hyun-sung, Woo Da-vi and Lee Jin-hyuk. It is the spin-off of the webseries Love Playlist. Directed by Park Jin-woo and Seo Joo-wan, and written by Lee Seul, the series follows the university life of six students at Seoyeon University as they search for "M" — the writer of a community article.

The airing of the first episode was postponed from its originally scheduled premiere date of February 26, 2021, on KBS2, in light of emerging school time bullying allegations against the lead actress, Park Hye-su. The series was originally part of a restructured 'Golden Friday' line-up on the KBS2 channel and was planned to air every Friday at 23:10 (KST).

It was instead released on OTT platforms U-Next in Japan, and on Viki in selected regions from June 29 to July 6, 2022. The next six episodes were released on July 6, 2022.

Four years after the cancellation of its planned broadcast, cable channel KBS Joy scheduled it to air on Mondays and Tuesdays at 9:50 p.m. KST time slot from April 14, 2025, to May 20, 2025. On June 25, 2025, KBS announced that Dear.M will finally air on KBS2 starting July 9 to August 14, every Wednesday and Thursday at 23:05 to 00:20 KST.

== Synopsis ==
Things are turned upside down when an anonymous confession is published on Seoyeon University's student forum. Four students – Ma Joo-ah (Park Hye-su), Cha Min-ho (Jeong Jae-hyun), Seo Ji-min (Roh Jeong-eui), and Park Ha-neul (Bae Hyun-sung) – from different departments come together in search of "M", the writer of the mysterious confession. They go through university life, changing friendships and realistic budding romances in the course of their search.

== Cast ==
=== Main ===
==== Women's Dormitory Room 103 ====
- Park Hye-su as Ma Joo-ah

Ma Joo-ah (21) is a 2nd-year student in the Department of Business Administration (Enrolled in 2019). Her dream is to find her first love. She is full of energy and an only daughter raised by a single mother. Cheerful and warm-hearted, she has been best friends with Cha Min-ho for twelve years. Her nickname Akma-Joo-ah (Devil-Joo-ah) was given to her by Min-ho since she keeps making fun of his past relationships. Due to her inquisitive nature, she is always meddling in her friends' business, but she is also generous and willing to help anyone who needs it. Joo-ah entered Seoyeon University through a support program that assists single-parent families, and she is uncomfortable when asked about her admission process. Although it has been one year since she entered Seoyeon University, she is still unsure about what she wants to do in the future. While others say they study hard because they have dreams, she studies hard because she doesn't have dreams. She has been single her entire life, but things start to change on the first day of the second semester of her second year when her heart flutters because of a guy. Her roommates are Seo Ji-min and Hwang Bo-young.

- Roh Jeong-eui as Seo Ji-min

Seo Ji-min (22) is a 2nd-year student in the Department of Economics (Enrolled in 2019). Her dream is to become the leader of the cheerleading squad. She boasts bright floral beauty as the Centre of the Seoyeon University cheer squad and is one half of Seoyeon University's official 'Magnet Couple' along with Park Ha-neul. Behind her innocent appearance, there is a reversal that causes a girl to crush. Ji-min is very adept in social situations and knows how to stand up boldly to seniors in the face of injustice. "Couple items" such as "couple rings", "couple trips", "couple photos"—everything is a hot topic when it comes to the pair. She is older than most of her peers as she repeated a course. Since many students in her grade either took a leave of absence or had to fulfil their enlistment duties, she is not close to many people except Ha-neul. However, later, she reunites with Choi Ro-sa, with whom she went to high school, and they quickly become close.

- Woo Da-vi as Hwangbo Young

Hwangbo Young (24) is a 1st year student in the Department of Business Administration (Enrolled in 2020). Her dream is to be able to eat all she wants. Unlike her young and cute-looking appearance, she is a very chic 24-year-old college student. She is deeply empathetic and is good at detecting subtle emotions. Although she has yet to obtain her Bachelor's degree, she is said to possess a Master of Dating. Young is relentless in relationships and will not hesitate to separate from someone who does not align with her relationship views. In Dorm 103, she often provides love advice to Ji-min, who is in the midst of a passionate relationship, and Joo-ah, who is experiencing her first crush. She graduated from a prestigious vocational high school and was employed immediately in a public corporation in the financial sector. However, after suffering discrimination from college graduates in various ways, she studied hard again and entered the Department of Business Administration. She has Type 1 Diabetes, and thus has kept an insulin syringe pouch with her every day since elementary school. Because of this, she has to be mindful of what she eats.

==== Men's Dormitory Room 203 ====
- Jeong Jae-hyun as Cha Min-ho

Cha Min-ho (21) is a 2nd-year student in the Department of Computer Science (Enrolled in 2019). His dream is to become an app developer and to buy his sister a house. He is bold and has good guts, with his speciality being teasing Ma Joo-ah, with whom he has been best friends for 12 years. Whilst he has a sloppy appearance, when he's hooked on something, he tends to become serious. He is the sexiest when coding in front of a computer, and he knows that as well. Min-ho has a talent for developing apps with his innovative ideas. After developing an anti-bullying app in high school, he entered Seoyeon University through special admission. He has been gaining popularity after creating an app called "밥팅 (BOBting)" that matches up people who eat alone at school, leading to potential relationships. By developing such an app, he seems to be in touch with human psychology, but Ma Joo-ah calls him "Min-hogu (Min-pushover)" because he has never been in a relationship longer than a month. His roommates are Park Ha-neul and Gil Mok-jin in Dorm 203. After their parents passed away 12 years ago, his sister Cha Min-ju gave up college to raise him, so he feels indebted to her. She never pressured him, but he wanted to take responsibility for her sacrifice and enter a prestigious university, thus never missing a scholarship. He works a part-time job because he no longer wants to burden his sister and because he is desperate to raise funds for her upcoming wedding.

- Bae Hyun-sung as Park Ha-neul

Park Ha-neul (22) is a 3rd-year student in the Department of Computer Science (Enrolled in 2018). His dream is to become a game developer. He is an honorary public relations ambassador and the other half of Seoyeon University's official 'Magnet Couple' along with Seo Ji-min. He is blunt and straight-forward, but a sweet boyfriend who enjoys taking photos of his girlfriend of 9 months. Since the beginning of their relationship, many things have happened. With the recent death of his father last winter, he came to realize that in his first two years of university, he did not have clear goals and was just going through life messily. So, in the second semester of his third year, he boldly transferred to the Department of Computer Science to pursue his dream of becoming a game developer. Many people around him are against it, but since he has the support of Ji-min, he feels that everything will turn out well. However, he doesn't realize his new major will be so difficult.

- Lee Jin-hyuk as Gil Mok-jin

Gil Mok-jin (23) is a 2nd-year student in the Department of Psychology (Enrolled in 2017). His dream is to no longer be single. He is considered a mood-maker with an outgoing and boisterous personality. In contrast to this, he is also strict when it comes to tidiness and loves to spend time shopping for cleaning supplies. Mok-jin is an older student who has returned from completing his military service, but his requests are often ignored by the younger occupants of Dorm 203. He cannot stand the smell of food, so he and his roommates often eat outside. Whilst his major is Psychology, he tends not to understand the psychology of those around him and particularly fails at understanding women. Mok-jin is desperate for a partner and is the most frequent user of Min-ho's "밥팅 (BOBting)" app. In his spare time, he is seen posting on the student forum, taking all kinds of psychological tests, and studying tarot cards and palmistry so that he can use them on his blind dates.

=== Supporting ===
==== Seoyeon University ====
- Lee Jung-shik as Moon Joon

Moon Joon (24) is a 3rd-year student in the Department of Computer Science (Enrolled in 2016). He is the son of Moon Taek-gun, CEO of Levan Soft. Joon is considered a role model by Min-ho and many other juniors because of his gentle manners and leadership skills. He is also an older student who has returned from completing his military service. He lives in a single premium one-person room with rent that is more expensive than at the dorms. Also, he lies to his father about making a mobile app, using Cha Min-ho as his cover.

- Hwang Bo-reum-byeol as Choi Ro-sa

Choi Ro-sa (22) is a 2nd-year student in the Department of Computer Science (Enrolled in 2018). She is the Vice President of the cheer squad and a bright and straightforward student who went to the same high school as Seo Ji-min. After finishing her first year, Ro-sa goes on exchange for a year and a half. Upon returning, she is worried about having no friends, but coincidentally reunites with Ji-min, whom she had lost contact with, and they get along just like old times. Ro-sa, however, becomes filled with jealousy towards Ji-min as she slowly develops a crush on Ji-min's boyfriend, Ha-neul.

- Kwon Eun-bin as Min Yang-hee

Min Yang-hee (20) is a 1st year student in the Department of Computer Science (Enrolled in 2020). Her nickname is the Goddess of Engineering. Her father is a pilot, so she grew up in wealth and always wears luxury brands. She can be oblivious, but her charms make her impossible to hate.

- Cho Jun-young as Ban Yi-dam

Ban Yi-dam (21) is a 1st year student in the Department of Psychology (Enrolled in 2020). He takes photography classes and has a free-spirited, unconventional personality.

- Do Woo as Choi Tae-jin

Choi Tae-jin (25) is a 4th-year student in the Department of Computer Science (Enrolled in 2015).

- Jun Sung-hwan as Tak Moo-young

Tak Moo-young (21) is a 2nd-year student in the Department of Business Administration (Enrolled in 2019).

- Choi Hee-seung as Kim Min-woo

Kim Min-woo (24) is a student in the Department of Business Administration (Enrolled in 2016) who is on a leave of absence.

==== Family members ====
- Yoon Jin-sol as Cha Min-ju

Cha Min-ju (31) is a bank employee and Cha Min-ho's sister. Ever since their parents died in a car accident when she was 19 years old, she has been raising Min-ho herself. She is the only one that Min-ho (who is considered smart and good at arguing) cannot win against. She is a good talker and has a good sense of humour. She is dating someone from work and is about to get married.

- Kim Joo-ah as Kim Mi-young

Kim Mi-young (48) has run Elephant Snacks for twelve years and is Ma Joo-ah's mother. She is kind and always willing to lend a hand to those in need. When she was young, she broke up with her alcoholic husband and raised Joo-ah alone. As it has always been just the two of them, they are very close.

- Hwang Gun as Moon Taek-geun

Moon Taek-gun (53) is the CEO of Levan Soft and Moon Jun's father. He is a first-generation IT mogul, and unlike his innovative company culture, he is quite harsh when it comes to academics.

- Song Kyung-hwa as Kim Jeong-im

Kim Jeong-im (49) is a professor and Park Ha-neul's mother. Her husband passed away last winter, so she is now alone. She is a person who is strong and warm enough to be Ha-neul's 'first love'.

- Lee Jae-baek as Seo Ji-hoon

Seo Ji-hoon (19) is a senior high-school student and Seo Ji-min's brother. He and Ji-min seem to bear no similarities.

==== Others ====
- Seo Hee-sun as Yoon Ho-jung
- Joyfle as Gru

== Production ==
=== Development ===
In late June 2020, it was reported that Love Playlist would be rebooted under the working title Dear.M: Love Playlist 2021 with new cast members, except for Bae Hyun-sung and Kim Sae-ron.

=== Casting ===
In September 2020, Park Hye-su Kim Sae-ron, Jeong Jae-hyun and Bae Hyun-sung were cast in lead roles, with Kim and Bae reprising their roles from the web series Love Playlist. The series marks Jeong Jae-hyun's acting debut. On October 12, 2020, Kim Sae-ron left the series due to a row over the cast billing order. On October 14, the production company cited a "difference of opinion" as the reason for Kim leaving the cast. Roh Jeong-eui replaced Kim.

=== Filming ===
The series is entirely pre-produced with filming scheduled to be completed in early February for the production team to focus on post-production and music editing.

== Release ==
The release of Dear.M was indefinitely postponed due to a controversy involving school violence allegations against Park Hye-su. In response to a petition on the KBS Viewer's Rights Centre requesting the removal of the actress from Dear.M, KBS Chief Producer (Jo Hyun-ah) stated, "As the truth is being challenged on the relevant matter and a police investigation is underway, KBS has implemented postponement of the drama, and we are monitoring the situation until the facts are revealed. Depending on the result [of the investigation], we will implement measures for all matters including the organisation and re-shooting of Dear.M." KBS stated that television series Imitation originally scheduled for May 21, 2021, will be aired on May 7, 2021.

In April 2021, it was announced that, for the time being, the series would be broadcast tentatively in August 2021. On January 11, 2022, it was announced that presently the series has been put on hold till the police investigation results come out.

In March 2022, it was announced that Dear.M would be aired first in Japan in the second half of 2022. KBS further confirmed that they were negotiating with other countries regarding the series' copyright license. In May 2022, the Japanese streaming platform U-NEXT announced in a press release that they would be exclusively distributing Dear.M starting in late June 2022. In June 2022, Viki restored Dear.M in their catalogue and re-released teasers.

On June 29, 2022, the first six episodes of Dear.M were digitally released on Viki and U-Next. Its next six episodes were released on July 6, 2022.

== Controversy ==
On February 24, KBS canceled the broadcast program as actor Park Hye-soo, who plays Majua, was embroiled in controversy over school violence. The schedule for the reorganization is undecided, and the schedule for the reorganization is unclear, as it is impossible to change roles due to the nature of the pre-produced drama that has already been filmed. Unless the allegations are clearly resolved, it seems difficult to air on terrestrial television.

== Ratings ==
=== KBS2 broadcast ===
Average TV viewership ratings (Nationwide)
Ep.	Original broadcast date	Average audience share (Nielsen Korea)
1	July 9, 2025	0.9%
2	July 10, 2025	0.6%
3	July 16, 2025	0.7%
4	July 17, 2025	0.8%
5	July 23, 2025	0.6%
6	July 24, 2025	0.5%
7	July 30, 2025	0.7%
8	July 31, 2025	0.6%
9	August 6, 2025	0.3%
10	August 7, 2025	0.5%
11	August 13, 2025	0.4%
12	August 14, 2025	0.6%
Average		0.6%
In the table above, the blue numbers represent the lowest ratings and the red numbers represent the highest ratings.

== Original soundtrack ==
=== Album ===
Dear. M

Soundtrack album by Various
- Released: July 14, 2022
- Genre: Soundtrack
- Languages: Korean; English
- Labels: Five senses Entertainment; Monster Union

Released on July 14, 2022
No.	Title	Music	Length
1.	"Freshman Welcome (Symphony for Dear.M)"	Jo Yoon-jung	2:32
2.	"Notification Setting_01"	Jo Yoon-jung, Chae Yoon	2:06
3.	"Waltz for Cats_Piano"	Jo Yoon-jung	2:19
4.	"Breakfast at Kissroad"	Anz	1:51
5.	"The First Kiss"	Jo Yoon-jung	2:41
6.	"One Side Love"	EZEE1 / EZEE2	2:41
7.	"Shooting Stars"	Jo Yoon-jung	2:41
8.	"Sign-up for Classes"	Jo Yoon-jung, Lee Jonghan	2:32
9.	"Waltz for Cats_Orchestra"	Anz	1:28
10.	"Notification Setting_02"	Jo Yoon-jung, Kim Ji-ae	1:22
11.	"Elephant Diner"	EZEE1 / EZEE2	1:20
12.	"Something in Between"	Kim Ji-ae	1:50
13.	"Group Project"	Jo Yoon-jung	1:52
14.	"Chicken Mayo"	Anz	1:05
15.	"Roommate"	EZEE1 / EZEE2	1:34
16.	"Notification Setting_03"	Jo Yoon-jung, Anz	1:43
17.	"Class on Monday Morning"	Jo Yoon-jung	2:45
