= Spring Love (Eric Nam and Wendy song) =

Single by Eric Nam and Wendy

from the album SM Station Season 1
- Released: March 4, 2016
- Genre: Acoustic
- Length: 3:18
- Songwriters: Hwang Hyun; Agnes Shin
- Producers: Kevin Writer; Douglas James

Eric Nam singles chronology
"A Second Is an Hour" (2015)	"Spring Love" (2016)	"Good for You" (2016)

Wendy singles chronology
"Let You Know" (2015)	"Spring Love" (2016)	"Don't Push Me" (2016)

Music video
- "Spring Love" on YouTube

"Spring Love" (Korean: 봄인가 봐; RR: Bominga bwa) is a song by South Korea-based American singer Eric Nam and South Korean singer Wendy, a member of the South Korean girl group Red Velvet. It was released digitally by SM Entertainment on March 4, 2016, as the fourth single of the first season of the label's digital music project, SM Station. Composed by Kevin Writer and Douglas James with lyrics by Hwang Hyun (MonoTree) and Agnes Shin, the song is an acoustic ballad about friends developing romantic feelings for one another as the season gets warmer in the beginning of spring.

The single was a commercial success upon its release. It was both Nam and Wendy's first top-ten entry on the Gaon Digital Chart, peaking at number seven on its second week. It eventually became the sixty-first best-selling song in South Korea in 2016, having achieved over 820,131 downloads. The song was also nominated for Best Collaboration at the 18th Mnet Asian Music Awards, but lost to Wendy's fellow labelmate Baekhyun with his collaboration single "Dream".

== Background and composition ==
In January 2016, S.M. Entertainment, one of the largest entertainment companies in South Korea, launched a digital music project called SM Station which would give their artists a platform to release music, with the intention of releasing a new single by an S.M. Entertainment artist each week for an entire year. Girls' Generation member Taeyeon started the digital project by releasing the single "Rain" on February 3, 2016. After two more releases, the company announced that Red Velvet member Wendy and non-S.M. Entertainment artist Eric Nam would be the fourth to participate in the project. On March 4, the single was released along with an accompanying music video.

"Spring Love"
"Spring Love" is a mid-tempo acoustic ballad.

"Spring Love" was produced by Kevin Writer and Douglas James, while its lyrics were penned by Hwang Hyun and Agnes Shin. The song is described as a mid-tempo ballad with an acoustic arrangement. Lyrically, it is a youthful song about friends falling in love as the weather grows warmer.

== Promotion and reception ==
A music video of the song directed by Shim Hyung-jun was premiered on the official YouTube channel of S.M. Entertainment in conjunction with the single's release. In it, Eric Nam and Wendy are depicted as a couple who enjoy their day together at an amusement park, riding various attractions.

In December 2016, Nam and Wendy sang the song on Yang&Nam Show, a show hosted by Nam, in which Red Velvet appeared as guests in its 4th episode. On March 30, 2017, they performed it live for the first time at KCON Mexico.

"Spring Love" was a commercial success in South Korea. It debuted at number ten on the Gaon Digital Chart, eventually peaked at number seven one week later, thus became both Nam and Wendy's first top-ten entry on the chart. Its accompanying music video was the ninth most watched K-pop video in America and tenth worldwide for the month of March. The single was the ninth best-selling song on the March issue of the Gaon Monthly Digital Chart, and went on to become the sixty-first best-selling song in South Korea in 2016, with a total sales of over 820,131 downloads.

Billboard included it in its '7 Essential K-Pop Songs' for spring in 2016 and in November, the song was nominated at the 18th Mnet Asian Music Awards for Best Collaboration.

== Track listing ==
Digital download / streaming

1. "Spring Love" – 3:18
2. "Spring Love" (Instrumental) – 3:18

== Credits and personnel ==
Credits adapted from Melon.

Studio

- Recorded and edited at In Grid Studio
- Edited at MonoTree Studio
- Mixed at SM Blue Ocean Studio
- Mastered at Sterling Sound

Personnel

- Eric Nam – vocals
- Wendy – vocals, background vocals
- Hwang Hyun – songwriting, arrangement, piano
- Shin Agnes – songwriting
- Kevin Writer – composition, arrangement
- Douglas James – composition, arrangement
- Lee Ju-hyung – vocal directing, background vocals, Pro Tools operation, digital editing
- Kim Byung-seok – bass
- Jeong Su-wan – guitar
- Gil Eun-kyung – keyboard
- Jeong Eun-kyung – recording, digital editing
- Woo Min-jung – recording
- Kim Chul-soon – mixing
- Tom Coyne – mastering

== Charts ==
=== Weekly charts ===
Weekly chart performance for "Spring Love"
Chart (2016)	Peak position
South Korea (Gaon)	7

=== Monthly charts ===
Monthly chart performance for "Spring Love"
Chart (March 2016)	Position
South Korea (Gaon)	9

=== Year-end charts ===
2016 year-end chart performance for "Spring Love"
Chart (2016)	Position
South Korea (Gaon)	74

== Release history ==
Release dates and formats for "Spring Love"
Region	Date	Format(s)	Label(s)	Ref.
Various	March 4, 2016	Digital download; streaming	SM Entertainment; KT Music	
