= Forever Only =

2022 single by Jaehyun

Single by Jaehyun
- Language: Korean; English
- Released: August 18, 2022
- Genre: R&B
- Length: 3:16
- Label: SM
- Composers: Dewain Whitmore Jr.; Micah Premnath; Tido Nguyen
- Lyricists: Jaehyun; Ellie Suh
- Producer: Tido Nguyen

Jaehyun singles chronology
"Try Again" (2017)	"Forever Only" (2022)	"Horizon" (2023)

Music video
- "Forever Only" on YouTube

"Forever Only" is a song recorded by South Korean singer Jaehyun. It was released on August 18, 2022, alongside an accompanying music video, as the fourth single of the NCT Lab project. The song was written by Jaehyun, Dewain Whitmore Jr., Ellie Suh, Micah Premnath, and producer Tido Nguyen. It is described as a guitar-driven R&B track reminiscent of the 2000s. Inspired by the time Jaehyun spent in Milan, the lyrics express one's yearning for the person they love. It charted at number 120 on the Circle Digital Chart in South Korea, and at number 14 on the Billboard World Digital Song Sales chart in the United States. The song received positive reviews from critics, with praise for its composition and Jaehyun's vocal performance.

== Background and release ==
On August 12, 2022, SM Entertainment announced that Jaehyun would release his first single on August 18. It would also be the fourth single featured on NCT Lab, a special season of the digital music project SM Station. Teaser images were revealed on NCT's social medias and a teaser for the music video was released on August 17. "Forever Only" and its accompanying music video were released on August 18. Its official remix by Shindrum was released on January 6, 2023, alongside a 3D music video.

== Composition ==
"Forever Only" was written by Jaehyun, Dewain Whitmore Jr., Ellie Suh, Micah Premnath, and Tido Nguyen, who also produced the song. It is an "acoustic-leaning" R&B track driven by recurring guitar riffs and featuring a percussion arrangement. The track is written in the key of E minor and has a medium tempo of 90 beats per minute. Lucy Ford of British GQ noted that the song "holds the kind of early-2000's boy band key changes". Adrianne Reece of Elite Daily said the instrumentation reminds her of the 2000s and compared it to "7 Days" by Craig David. Jaehyun's vocal performance was described as "alluring", "deep" and "lush" by Divyansha Dongre of Rolling Stone India. The lyrics express the desire to find permanent companionship in a fickle world. Jaehyun said that after hearing the "bright" melody of the song for the first time he "felt lonely inside of that kind of mood", so he decided to counter the "positive" sound with lyrics centered around the theme of loneliness. The lyrics were also inspired by the time he spent in Milan.

== Chart performance ==
In South Korea, "Forever Only" debuted at number 120 on the Circle Digital Chart in the issue dated August 14–20, 2022. It also debuted at number nine and 29 on its component charts, the Circle Download Chart and the Circle BGM Chart, respectively. In the United States, the song debuted at number 14 on the Billboard World Digital Song Sales chart in the issue dated September 3, 2022.

== Critical reception ==
Kim Soo-yeong of the Hankyung praised Jaehyun's vocals, saying that "you can fully feel the potential of Jaehyun, the emotional vocalist, beyond Jaehyun, the performer". Divyansha Dongre of Rolling Stone India highlighted the "wealth of ad-libs" and "dreamy falsetto performance", saying it ties "the sonic elements together [of the song] beautifully whilst simultaneously adding depth and dimension to the track". Praising the track, Dongre said: "Soothing, comforting and easy to listen to, "Forever Only" is a single that grows on you almost instantaneously". Jeff Benjamin of Billboard highlighted Jaehyun's "fondness for simplicity", saying that the single's cover is "a far cry from his album covers with NCT 127", and noted that the song puts Jaehyun's "silvery tenor at the forefront". Lucy Ford and Jessie Atkinson of British GQ named "Forever Only" as one of the 22 best songs of 2022, noting the song's 2000s-inspired R&B composition, which they say is the "natural home" for Jaehyun's "distinctive earthy and oaky quality" vocals. The song was selected by Ashlee Mitchell to be featured on Teen Vogue's list of the 79 best K-pop songs of 2022. She said the song is "easy listening, melodic, and soundtracks a warm winter night just as well as a summer outside". Writing for Rolling Stone India, Amit Vaidya placed it at number 66 on her list of the 100 best international songs of 2022, stating that "Forever Only" is "a slice of R&B-pop that would have fit in perfectly sandwiched between hits by Ashanti, Craig David and Usher", but "still fits the pop landscape" thanks to the modern production.

Year-end lists
Critic/Publication	List	Rank	Ref
Atwood Magazine	Best Songs of 2022	Placed	
British GQ	The 22 Best Songs of 2022	Placed	
Rolling Stone India	The 100 Best International Songs of 2022	66	
Teen Vogue	The 79 Best K-Pop Songs of 2022	Placed	

== Music video and live performance ==
Shot in just one day, the music video expresses the feeling of loneliness and emptiness caused by parting from your lover. It features Jaehyun singing and playing the guitar, lounging in a room surrounded by photographs, and riding a motorcycle, all in the span of a day. Jaehyun participated in the conception of the music video. Dongre said the music video employs "a somber color palette and hazy filters [that create] a gloomy atmosphere". Mary Siroky of Consequence also likened the shots to an A24 film, "all golden-hued, nostalgic and romantic footage".

Jaehyun performed "Forever Only" for the first time on a music-dedicated segment of The NCT Show, a web series featuring NCT members released on YouTube.

== Track listing ==
- Digital download and streaming
1. "Forever Only" – 3:16
2. "Forever Only" (Instrumental) – 3:16

== Credits and personnel ==
Credits adapted from Melon.

Studio

- Recorded at Doobdoob Studio
- Engineered for mix at SM Starlight Studio
- Mixed at Sound Pool Studios
- Mastered at 821 Sound Mastering

Personnel

- Jaehyun – vocals, lyrics
- Ellie Suh – lyrics
- Dewain Whitmore Jr. – composition
- Micah Premnath – composition, background vocals
- Tido Nguyen – composition, producer, instruments
- Yoo Young-jin – music and sound supervisor
- Ju Chang-yang – vocal directing, background vocals
- Ani Nnebedum – background vocals
- Eugene Kwon – recording
- Woo Min-jeong – digital editing
- Jeong Yu-ra – engineered for mix
- Kim Han-goo – mixing
- Kwon Nam-woo – mastering

== Charts ==
Weekly chart performance for "Forever Only"
Chart (2022)	Peak position
South Korea (Circle)	120
US World Digital Song Sales (Billboard)	14

== Release history ==
Release dates and formats for "Forever Only"
Region	Date	Format	Label	Ref.
Various	August 18, 2022	Digital download; streaming	SM; Dreamus	
