= Emotional Oranges =

American pop music group

Background information
- Origin: Los Angeles, California, U.S.
- Genres: R&B; pop; neo soul
- Years active: 2017–present
- Labels: Avant Garden; Island
- Members: Azad Right; Vali Porter
- Website: emotionaloranges.com

Emotional Oranges is an American R&B/pop duo from Los Angeles, California.

== History ==
Emotional Oranges was formed in 2017 when Azad "A" Right, an audio engineer for Drake, and Vali "V" Porter, a vocal coach for Adele, met at a bar mitzvah.

The group released its first single "Motion" on SoundCloud on May 4, 2018. It was later used as the theme song of RuPaul's Drag Race.

On May 10, 2019, the group released their first mixtape, The Juice: Vol. I. Their second, The Juice: Vol. II. was released on November 8, 2019. Both were released through Avant Garden Records and Island Records.

Emotional Oranges has cited The Weeknd, The xx, Lauryn Hill, and Matty Healy from The 1975 as influences.

== Career ==
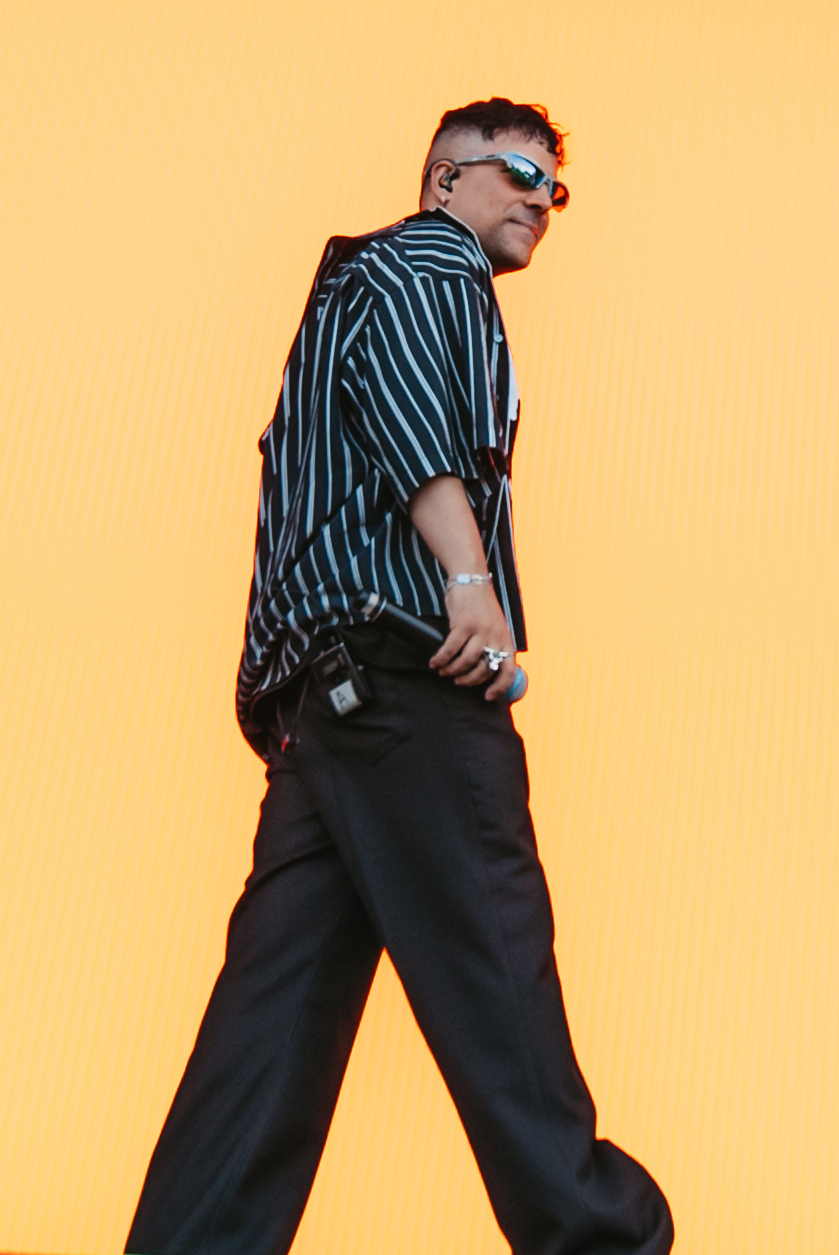
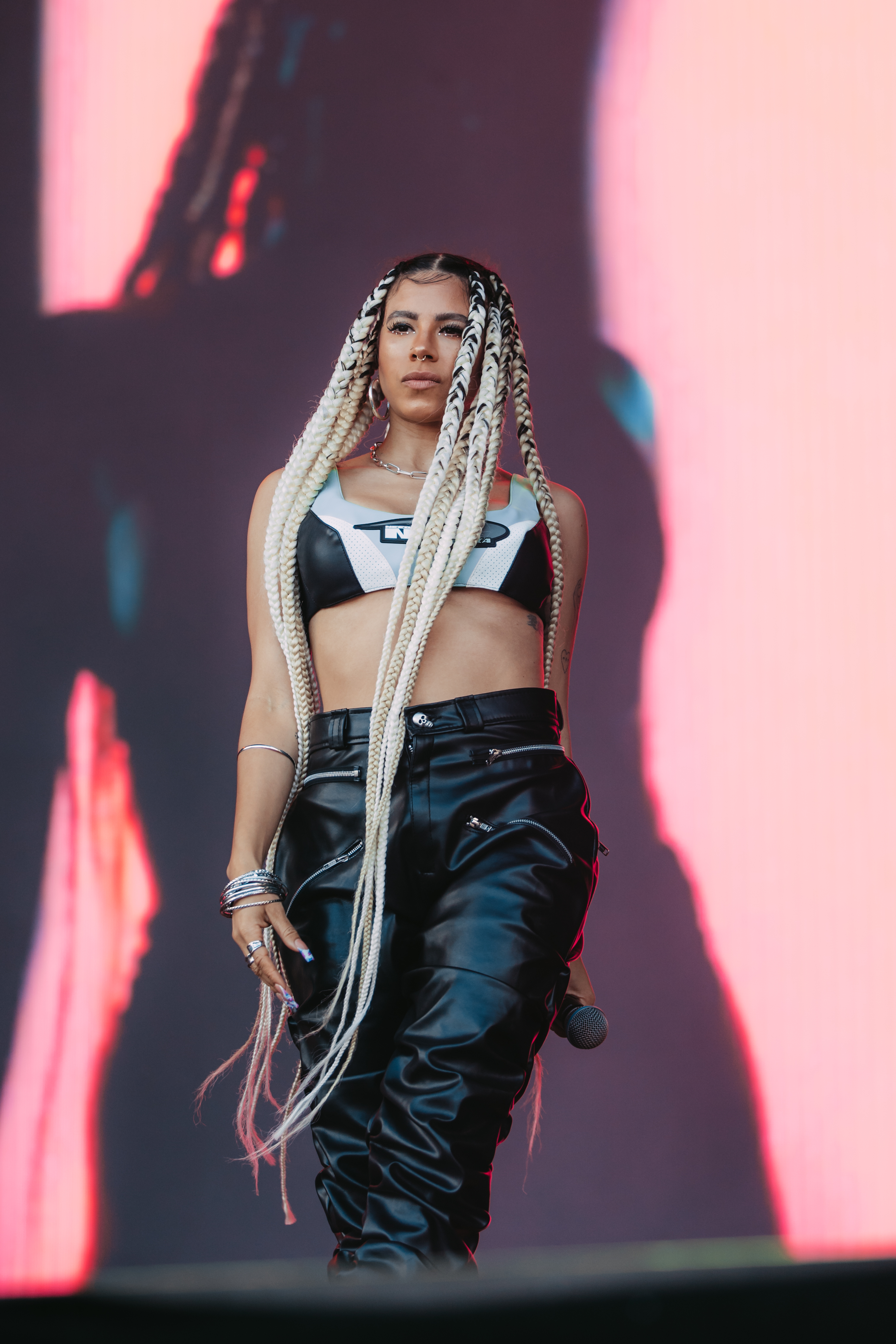
Emotional Oranges during a performance in Positivus Festival 2023

On May 10, 2019, the Emotional Oranges released The Juice: Vol. I. Emotional Oranges sold out its first headline run, called The Chill, Baby Chill tour. After playing the El Rey Theatre in Los Angeles and the Music Hall of Williamsburg in Brooklyn, the group toured in London, Paris and Amsterdam. Leading up to the release of its second mixtape, Emotional Oranges went back on the road for A Very Emotional Tour with support from Avant Garden label-mates Chiiild. This tour took them to Japan, Australia, New Zealand, the US, Canada, and Europe.

Emotional Oranges performed "Personal" and "Your Best Friend Is a Hater" for Vevo's DSCVR Program.

On November 8, 2019, the duo released their second mixtape The Juice, Vol. II through Avant Garden Records and Island Records.

On October 13, 2020, the group released the song "All That" with Channel Tres from their mixtape The Juicebox. They later released the second single, "Bonafide", with experimental band Chiiild on January 13, 2021.

On April 13, 2021, the group released the single "Down to Miami" ft. Becky G.

On June 11, 2021, their third mixtape, The Juicebox, released featuring the previous four singles as well as features from Vince Staples, THEY., Yendry, and Kiana Ledé.

On 30 August 2022, the duo announced plans to return to Australia and New Zealand for The Sad Fruit Tour, with performances at the Metro Theatre in Sydney, Max Watts in Melbourne, The Triffid in Brisbane, and the Powerstation in Auckland. All performances took place in October 2022.

== Discography ==
=== Studio albums ===
Title	Details
Orenjii	Released: May 16, 2025; Labels: Avant Garden; Formats: Digital download

=== Mixtapes ===
Title	Details
The Juice: Vol. I	Released: May 10, 2019; Labels: Avant Garden, Island; Formats: CD, digital download, LP
The Juice: Vol. II	Released: November 8, 2019; Labels: Avant Garden, Island; Formats: CD, digital download, LP
The Juicebox	Released: June 11, 2021; Labels: Avant Garden, Island; Formats: Digital download, LP
The Juice: Vol. III	Released: December 9, 2022; Labels: Avant Garden; Formats: Digital download
Still Emo	Released: August 11, 2023; Labels: Avant Garden; Formats: Digital download

=== Extended plays ===
Title	Album details
Blended (with Nonso Amadi)	Released: January 26, 2024; Labels: Avant Garden, Island; Formats: CD, digital download, LP

=== Singles ===
Title	Year	Album
"Motion"	2018	The Juice: Vol. I
"Personal"	2018	The Juice: Vol. I
"Hold You Back"	2019	The Juice: Vol. I
"Corners of My Mind"	2019	The Juice: Vol. I
"Don't Be Lazy"	2019	The Juice: Vol. II
"Just Like You"	2019	The Juice: Vol. II
"Your Best Friend Is a Hater"	2019	The Juice: Vol. II
"Sundays"	2019	The Juice: Vol. II
"All That" (with Channel Tres)	2020	The Juicebox
"Bonafide" (featuring Chiiild)	2021	The Juicebox
"Body & Soul" (featuring Biig Piig)	2021	The Juicebox
"Down to Miami" (featuring Becky G)	2021	The Juicebox
"Make Me Wanna"	2022	The Juice: Vol. III
"Bounce"	2022	The Juice: Vol. III
"Cardigan" (featuring Unusual Demont)	2022	Non-album single
"Be Somebody" (featuring Tkay Maidza)	2023	Still Emo
"Nowhere" (featuring Nonso Amadi)	2023	Blended
"Ready"	2024	Non-Album Single
"Hot Outside" (featuring Anycia)	2024	Orenjii
"Peak"	2024	Non-Album Single
"Candy Gum" (featuring Jessie Reyez and Becky G)	2025	Orenjii
"Out The Blue"	2025	Orenjii
"Call It Off" (featuring Jaehyun)	2025	Orenjii
