= Horizon (song) =

Single by Jaehyun
- Language: Korean; English
- Genre: R&B; Soul
- Length: 3:42
- Label: SM
- Composers: Jaehyun; Deez; Soulfish
- Lyricist: Jaehyun

Jaehyun singles chronology
| "Forever Only" (2022) | "Horizon" (2023) | "Roses" / "Dandelion" (2024) |

Music video
- "Horizon" on YouTube

"Horizon" is a song recorded by South Korean singer Jaehyun. It was released on August 8, 2023, alongside an accompanying music video, as part of the NCT Lab music archival project. The song was written by Jaehyun, who co-composed it with Deez and Soulfish. It is described as an R&B and soul song with elements of jazz key and rhythmic guitar riff, while its lyrics express the romantic scenery of the skyline from the point-of-view inside an airplane. "Horizon" marks Jaehyun's second solo single following "Forever Only" (2022) and his third overall single after the collaboration track "Try Again" (2017). It debuted at number 38 on South Korea's Circle Digital Chart, making it Jaehyun's highest-charting solo single and the second highest-charting single under NCT Lab.

== Background and release ==
On August 1, 2023, SM Entertainment announced that NCT Lab, a digital music platform for individual projects of NCT members, will become independent from the company-wide SM Station project. The reconstruction includes four new digital singles, beginning with Jaehyun's second solo single. On August 2, the song was revealed to be titled "Horizon", and teasers were subsequently released on NCT's official social media accounts from August 4 to 6. The song and its accompanying music video were released on August 8.

== Composition ==
Featuring Korean and English lyrics solely written by Jaehyun, "Horizon" talks about a romantic encounter while overlooking at the horizon from an airplane. In an interview with NME, Jaehyun reveals that he wrote the song during his busy schedules across different countries: “The day that I mostly thought about while writing the song was a day that was really cloudy and gloomy. I was on a schedule to another place, so I rode an airplane and once I went up beyond the clouds, it was really calm and bright."

For its composition, Jaehyun collaborated with frequent NCT producer Deez and Soulfish. Described as a "captivating R&B summer song", the song features a soft, traditional R&B/soul melody, and composed of jazz key and acoustic guitar riff. Lucy Ford of NME describes it as "a breezy and light song about piercing the clouds and finding the serenity above them", and is accompanied by Jaehyun's "oaky baritone" vocals.

== Music video ==
The music video was filmed in Florence, Italy, during Jaehyun's visit to the country for Milan Fashion Week. It was directed by Byul Yun, who also directed the music video for "28 Reasons" by Seulgi and the track video for "I'm Unhappy" by Aespa. An independent film-like style, it features Jaehyun on a lone trip across Italy, riding a bike and lounging in a classic Italian home. Also included in the music video are shots from a camcorder personally filmed by Jaehyun.

== Charts ==
Chart performance for "Horizon"
| Chart (2023) | Peak position |
|---|---|
| South Korea (Circle) | 38 |
