= Park Hye-su =

South Korean actress and singer (born 1994)

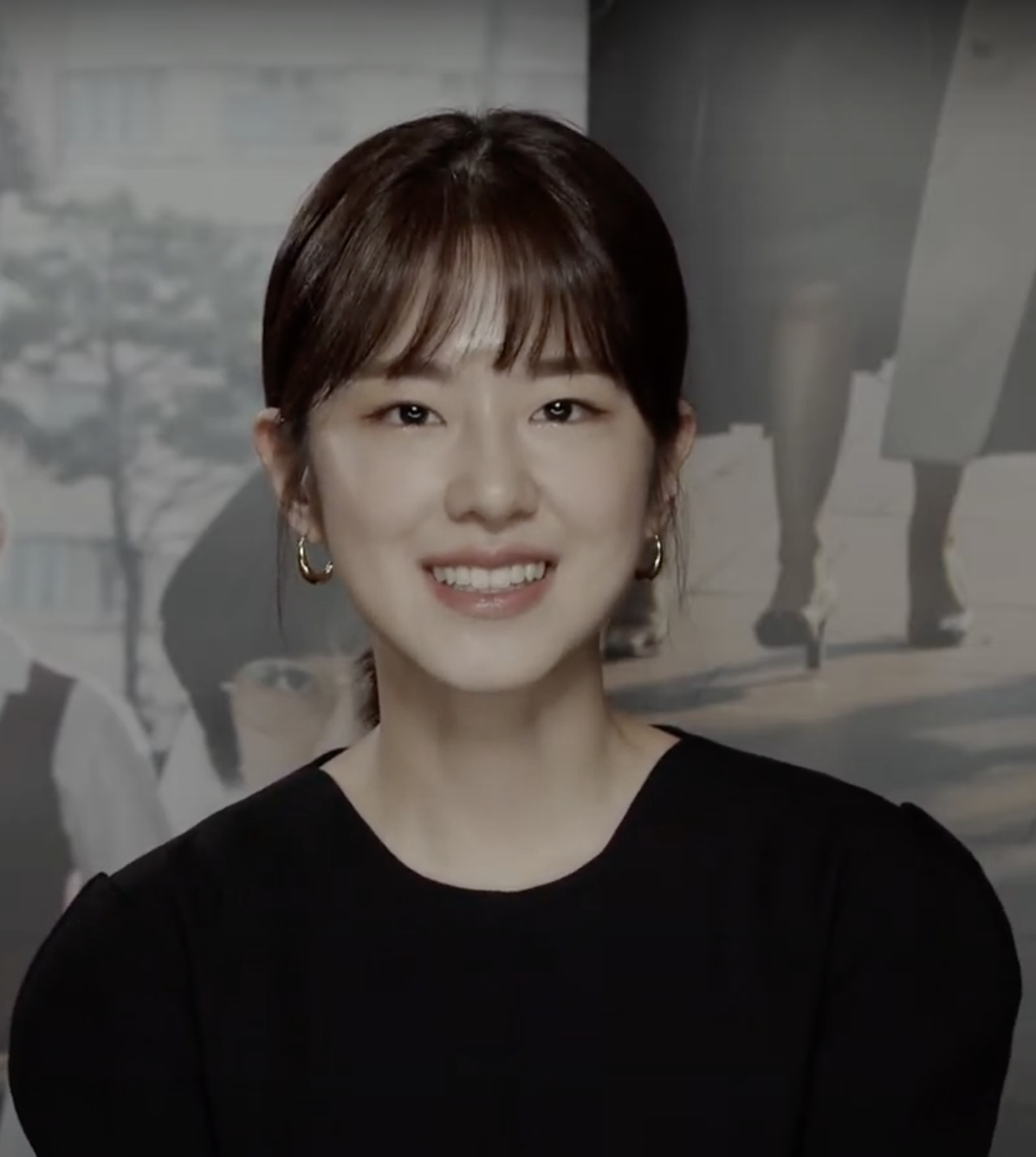
- Park in 2020
- Born: November 24, 1994 (age 31); Seoul, South Korea
- Education: Korea University – Korean Language and Literature
- Occupations: Actress; singer
- Years active: 2014–2022

Korean name
- Hangul: 박혜수
- Hanja: 朴惠秀
- RR: Bak Hyesu
- MR: Pak Hyesu

Park Hye-su (Korean: 박혜수; born November 24, 1994), also spelled as Park Hye-soo, is a South Korean actress and singer. She participated in K-pop Star 4 as a contestant. Park rose to fame for her role in Hello, My Twenties!. She took on her first lead role in Introverted Boss.

== Controversy ==
=== Bullying allegations ===
In 2021, several alleged victims shared their stories online on how they were physically abused by her when they were in middle school. She denied all the allegations through her agency Studio Santa Claus Entertainment. The allegations led to the delay in releasing the series Dear.M. Dispatch later reported that the allegations were false, claiming that the victim was lying and uncovering text messages that the two were actually friends in school.

== Filmography ==
=== Film ===
Year	Title	Role	Notes	Ref.
2016	Will You Be There?	Han Soo-ah		
2018	Swing Kids	Yang Pan-rae		
2020	Samjin Company English Class	Shim Bo-ram		
2022	The Dream Songs		Independent film; Premiere at 27th BIFF	

=== Television series ===
Year	Title	Role	Ref.
2015	Yong-pal	Kim So-hyun	
2016	Hello, My Twenties!	Yoo Eun-jae	
2017	Saimdang, Memoir of Colors	young Saimdang	
2017	Introverted Boss	Chae Ro-woon	
2022	Dear.M	Ma Joo-ah	

=== Television show ===
Year	Title	Role	Notes	Ref.
2014–2015	K-pop Star 4	Contestant		
2017	King of Mask Singer	Contestant	as "Never-ending Merry-go-round" (Ep. 93)	

=== Music video appearances ===
Year	Song title	Artist	Ref.
2016	"Here I Am"	Yesung	

== Discography ==
=== Soundtrack appearances ===
List of soundtrack appearances, showing year released, selected chart positions, and name of the album
Title	Year	Peak chart positions	Album
Title	Year	KOR Gaon	Album
"Love Song" (Yook Sung-jae featuring Park Hye-su)	2015	8	Who Are You: School 2015 OST Part. 8
"Remember Me Only"	2015	—	Yong-pal OST
"Sad Fate"	2016	—	Lucky Romance OST
"—" denotes releases that did not chart or were not released in that region.

== Awards and nominations ==
Name of the award ceremony, year presented, category, nominee of the award, and the result of the nomination
Award ceremony	Year	Category	Nominee / Work	Result	Ref.
Asia Artist Awards	2016	Rising Star Award	Hello, My Twenties!	Won	
Blue Dragon Film Awards	2019	Best New Actress	Swing Kids	Nominated	
Blue Dragon Film Awards	2021 (Note: Delayed until 2021 due to COVID-19.)	Best Supporting Actress	Samjin Company English Class	Nominated	
Buil Film Awards	2019	Best New Actress	Swing Kids	Nominated	
Director's Cut Awards	2019	Best New Actress	Swing Kids	Nominated	
Golden Cinema Film Festival	2019	Best New Actress	Swing Kids	Won	
