= Liu Yuning filmography =

Actor filmography

- Feature films: 5
- Television series: 16
- Animation: 1
- Variety show: 14

This article contains the filmography of Chinese actor Liu Yuning.

== Film ==
Year	Release date	Title	Role	Notes
2016	November 17	Class 952 (九五2班)	He Tao (何涛)	Web film, male lead
2017	August 6	Secret Imprisonment (秘密囚禁)	Du Feng (杜风)	Web film, supporting cast
2017	October 12	Qin Zei You Dao (秦贼有道)	Aaron (阿龙)	Web film, supporting cast
2018	March 12	Romantic Zhen Xing Shi (罗曼蒂克振兴史)	Yan Xiao-ning (严小宁)	Web film, male lead
2019	August 7	Line Walker 2: Invisible Spy (使徒行者2: 谍影行动)	Bill	Feature film, cameo

== Television series ==
Year	Premiere date	Title	Role	Network	Notes
2019	October 22	Hot-blooded Youth (热血少年)	Wei Cheng-feng (卫乘风)		Recurring cast
2020	August 18	Love Yourself (其实没有那么爱你)	Dr. He Han (贺涵)		6 episodes
2020	December 10	Ultimate Note (终极笔记)	Hei Yan-jing (黑眼镜)		Recurring cast
2021	March 31	The Long Ballad (长歌行)	Hao Du (皓都)		Recurring cast
2021	September 26	Medal of the Republic (功勋)	Signaller		1 episode
2022	May 23	Heroes (说英雄谁是英雄)	Bai Chou-fei (白愁飞)		Main cast
2022	August 28	Discovery of Romance (恋爱的夏天)	Liu Yi-ning (刘一宁)		1 episode
2023	July 12	Legend of Anle (安乐传)	Luo Ming-xi (洛铭西)		Main cast
2023	July 17	Be Your Own Light (做自己的光)	Jiang Jun-hao (蒋俊豪)		Main cast
2023	November 6	Wonderland of Love (乐游原)	Mu Xian-he (慕仙鶴)		2 episodes
2023	November 28	A Journey to Love (一念关山)	Ning Yuan-zhou (宁远舟)		Lead
2024	February 27	Eternal Brotherhood (紫川·光明三杰)	Di Lin (帝林)		Main cast
2024	May 8	Heroes (天行健)	Zhuo Bu-fan (卓不凡)		Main cast
2024	November 1	The Story of Pearl Girl (珠帘玉幕)	Yan Zi-jing (燕子京)		Male Lead
2025	May 13	The Prisoner of Beauty (折腰)	Wei Shao (魏劭)		Male Lead
2025	May 30	Eternal Brotherhood 2 (紫川之光明王)	Di Lin (帝林)		Main cast
2025	June 26	A Dream Within a Dream (书卷一梦)	Nan Heng, Li Shi-Liu (南珩/离十六)		Lead
TBA		Limited Skies (遮天)			Guest
TBA		The Land of Warriors (斗罗大陆2)	Poseidon (波塞冬)		Guest
TBA		Cicada Girl (蝉女)	Xiao Bei (小贝)		Lead
TBA		Yakuza: Like a Dragon (人中之龙)	Goro Majima (真岛吾朗)		

== Animation ==
Year	Premiere date	Title	Role	Notes
2022	July 15	Cang Lan Jue (苍兰诀)	Jiu Yuan (九渊)	Voice actor, main cast
TBA		Cang Lan Jue 2 (苍兰诀2 影三界篇)	Jiu Yuan (九渊)	Voice actor, main cast

== Variety show ==
Year	Show	Role	Broadcast Channel	Performance
2018	Golden Melody 2 (金曲捞之挑战主打歌)	Melody Guardian	Jiangsu TV	Episode 5 - "Light Years Away" (光年之外) by G.E.M. Episode 11 - "Just Right" (刚刚好) by Joker Xue
2018	Masked Singer S3 (蒙面唱将猜猜猜 第三季)	Contestant	Jiangsu TV	Episode 5 - "How to say I don't love you" (怎么说我不爱你) with Jerry Yuan (袁成杰) Episode 6 - "Slowly" (慢慢) with Julia Zhu (朱桦) & "Red Rose" (红玫瑰); Episode 11 - "Book of forgotten laughter" (笑忘书) with Vincy Chan
2019	Singer 2019 (歌手2019)	Challenger Singer Candidate	Hunan TV	Episode 3 - "Someone like me" (像我这样的人) by Mao Buyi & "Animal world" (动物世界) by Joker Xue
2019	Our Brilliant Masters (我们的师父)	Cast Member	Hunan TV	with Yu Xiaoguang, Wowkie Zhang, and Dong Sicheng
2019	Singing with Legends (我们的歌)	Contestant	Shanghai TV	Episode 1 – "Beggar" (乞丐), "I Can Never Understand Your Love" (你的柔情我永远不懂) with Luo Qi; Episode 2 – "Let Him Go" (心太软) & "Afterwards" (后来) with Richie Jen; Episode 5 – "The Bold and the Beautiful" (爱江山更爱美人) & "Count on me" (依靠) with Richie Jen; Episode 8 – "Fireworks Fade Away" (烟花易冷) with Wang Linkai & "Back Here Again" (浪子回头) with Luo Qi and Richie Jen; Episode 9 – "The Cloud Knows" (如果云知道) with Richie Jen; Episode 10 – "The End of the Sky" (天涯) with Richie Jen
2020	Fresh Chef 100 (鲜厨100)	Cast Member	Hunan TV	Recommendation Officer with Chef Lin Shu Wei, Food Connoisseur Zhao Yinyin, Chef Zhang Liang, and Qian Feng
2020	Chinese Restaurant S4 (中餐厅 第四季)	Guest	Hunan TV	Episodes 7–11
2020	Go Fighting! Treasure Tour S1 (极限挑战宝藏行)	Guest	Shanghai TV	Episodes 8–10
2021	Fresh Chef 100 S2 (鲜厨100 第二季)	Cast Member	Hunan TV	Chef Instructor with Chef Lin Shu Wei, Food Connoisseur Zhao Yinyin, and Chef Zhang Liang
2021	Singing with Legends 3 (我们的歌 第三季)	Contestant	Shanghai TV	Group B, with David Lui, Penny Tai, Bibi Zhou, Wowkie Zhang, Silence Wang, Zhai Xiao Wen, Meng Hui Yuan, and Shan Yi Chun Episode 3 – "Till the end" (啊默契) & "Night after night" (夜夜夜夜) with Penny Tai; Episode 4 – "Wild roses" (野蔷薇) & Blessing from the street corner (街角的祝福) with Penny Tai; Episode 6 – "Beat you up" (我是来揍你的) with Penny Tai; Episode 7 – "Rain keeps falling" (雨一直下) with Penny Tai and Bibi Zhou & "Ladies' Kingdom" (女儿国) with Shan Yi Chun; Episode 10 – "First Love" (初恋) with Penny Tai & "Zen Yang" (怎样) with Penny Tai; Episode 11 – "Restraint" (矜持) with Penny Tai; Episode 12 – "Merry Go Round" (潇洒走一回) with Penny Tai
2022	The Truth (开始推理吧)	Cast Member (Liu Xia Lai)	Tencent Video	with Bai Yu, Zhou Shen, Guo Qilin, Song Zuer, Zhou Keyu.
2024	The Truth 2 (开始推理吧2)	Cast Member	Tencent Video	with Bai Yu, Dilireba, Zhang Linghe, Zhou Keyu
2024	Singing with Legends 6 (我们的歌 第六季)	Contestant	Shanghai TV	Episode 1 – "Drawing board of love" (恋爱画板) with Penny Tai Episode 2 - "Finding you" (寻一个你) with Chen Lijun & "The Flowery Heart" (花心) with Wowkie Zhang and Mao Buyi; Episode 11 - "Naked" (赤裸裸) with Wowkie Zhang & "Achu Girl" (阿楚姑娘) with Shila Amzah; Episode 12 - "Blue and white" (青花) with Steve Chou & "All the way with you" (一路上有你) with Ms.OOJA
2024	Melody Journey (音乐缘计划)	Singer	Jiangsu TV, iQiyi	Episode 7 - "Azure" (这蔚蓝), written by Zhou Fujian & "Do you dare" (你敢吗), written by Ding Yu. Episode 8 - "A song for you" (想给你写首歌) with Lil Ghost, written by Ma Runhan (Refre$H). Episode 10 - "Fall" (掉), written by Bryan Sun. Episode 11 - "The Hard Workers" (努力的人), written by Li Bofan.
