= Delight (Baekhyun EP) =

- Digital cover

EP by Baekhyun
- Released: May 25, 2020
- Recorded: 2020
- Studios: SM Studios, Seoul, South Korea
- Genre: R&B
- Length: 23:45
- Language: Korean
- Labels: SM; Dreamus
- Producers: Lee Soo-man; Kenzie; Mike Dalley; Omega; Deez; Colde

Baekhyun chronology
City Lights (2019)	Delight (2020)	Baekhyun (2021)

Singles from Delight
- 1. "Candy" Released: May 25, 2020

Professional ratings
Review scores
Source	Rating
IZM	3.5/5 stars
SCMP	3.5/5 stars

Delight is the second extended play by South Korean singer Baekhyun. It was released on May 25, 2020, by SM Entertainment, and contains seven tracks, including the lead single, "Candy". The EP is available in four versions: Cinnamon, Honey, Mint, and Chemistry, which was released on June 29.

The album sold over 1,000,000 copies, making it the first album by a South Korean soloist to do so in 19 years, and one of the best-selling albums in South Korea.

== Background and release ==
Baekhyun debuted as a solo artist in July 2019, with City Lights, which was commercially successful and sold over half-a-million copies in 2019. On April 22, 2020, it was reported that he was preparing for a second solo album and participated in various aspects of the production process. SM Entertainment later confirmed the statement and announced the release of Baekhyun's second EP in late May. On May 6, the album's title and release date were announced.

SM Entertainment began releasing teasers and mood-sampler videos on May 12 through Exo's official social media accounts. On May 13, the album's notable producers were revealed, consisting of South Korean producer Kenzie, and American producers Mike Daley, Omega, Deez and Colde.

The album and its title track's music video were released on May 25 at 6PM KST both digitally and physically. On May 29, the live video for "Love Again" was released on YouTube via the SM Station channel.

== Composition ==
Delight features seven songs of different R&B subgenres. The title track "Candy" is described as a future R&B song with addictive synth instrumentation and a trendy melody. Lyrically, it expresses Baekhyun's colourful charms like various tastes of candy including, cinnamon, mint, strawberry and bubble gum. It was written by songwriter Kenzie, while production was handled by Mike Daley, Mitchell Owens, Deez and Adrian McKinnon with additional arrangement by Yoo Yeong-jin.

"I wanted to take a step further and show a different side to my fans. I wanted to incorporate more performance, which means a lot of choreography and thinking about the visuals on stage. I also tried to make this album a little brighter and fresher than City Lights."

— Baekhyun about the main difference between his albums.

"R U Ridin'?" is an urban R&B hip hop song with a chill trap-based instrumentation and melody with love-whispering lyrics that make you feel like you're driving through the downtown of a city. The third track "Bungee" is a mid-tempo R&B song with a piano melody. The lyrics are a metaphor for falling in love and swimming in the sea. "Poppin'" is characterized as an urban R&B hip hop song, with lyrics expressing the overwhelming feelings of happiness that burst out while in love. "Underwater" is a dreamy mid-tempo R&B song with lyrics about the feeling of ones heart submerged in an ocean of sadness after losing someone they loved, while "Ghost" is described as an alternative R&B song featuring lyrics about comparing a lover to a ghost in order to endure the hardships of separation from them. The last song "Love Again" is a lyrical contemporary R&B song with lyrics about longing to love a partner once more at the end of a relationship.

== Promotion ==
An hour before the music video and album's release, Baekhyun appeared on a live broadcast through the Naver app V Live, where he promoted and discussed the album. On June 3, Baekhyun won his first Show Champion trophy with "Candy", despite not attending nor performing at the show. Baekhyun had his first music show performance for the lead single on Music Bank, followed by his promotion on Inkigayo. The song has since achieved a total of three trophies, tying with "UN Village" as his most winning title on such television music shows.

== Commercial performance ==
On May 25, 2020, Korean news media reported that pre-orders for Delight had reached 732,297 copies as of May 24, making it the most pre-ordered album by a solo artist in South Korean history. Upon release, the album recorded the highest first week sales for a solo artist in Gaon chart history and debuted at number one on the Album Chart for the week 22 issue ending May 30. It topped the monthly chart for May with a total of 660,826 copies sold. Following the release of its Kit version on June 26, the album returned to number one on the week 27 chart issue for the period ending July 4.

In June, Delight surpassed 971,000 cumulative sales, making Baekhyun the first soloist to qualify for Triple Platinum certification from the Korea Music Copyright Association (KMCA). On July 1, it was announced that the album had surpassed 1 million sales, making it the first album by a soloist in South Korea to do so since Another Days (2001) by Kim Gun-mo.

Internationally, the album debuted at number five on the Billboard World Albums chart in the United States, giving Baekhyun his second top-five entry on the ranking. In Japan, it charted at number 9 on the Oricon Albums Chart.

== Track listing ==
Delight track listing
No.	Title	Lyrics	Music	Arrangement	Length
1.	"Candy"	Kenzie	Mike Daley; Mitchell Owens; Deez; Adrian McKinnon	Mike Daley; Mitchell Owens; Deez; Yoo Young-jin	3:48
2.	"R U Ridin'?"	Kenzie	Kenzie; Mike Daley; Mitchell Owens; Wilbart "Vedo" McCoy III	Mike Daley; Mitchell Owens	2:55
3.	"Bungee"	Jane (Channel 23)	Aisle (Channel 23); Jane (Channel 23); Jeon Byung-sun (Royal Dive) (Joombas); Hong Young-in (Royal Dive) (Joombas); Brian Cho	Brian Cho; Royal Dive (Joombas)	3:27
4.	"Underwater"	Cho Min-young (lalala Studio); Lee Yi-jin (lalala Studio)	Kim Yeon-seo (ADC Music); minGtion (ADC Music)	ADC Music	3:20
5.	"Poppin'"	Kenzie	Jonathan Yip; Ray Romulus; Jeremy Reeves; Ray Charles McCullough II; August Rigo	The Stereotypes	3:29
6.	"Ghost"	JQ (Makeumine Works); Mola (Makeumine Works); Kang Eun-yu (Makeumine Works)	Klara Ósk Elíasdóttir; Alma Goodman; Tony Ferrari; Larus "Leo" Arnarson; Michael "Omega" Fonseca; Bram Inscore	Larus "Leo" Arnarson; Michael "Omega" Fonseca; Bram Inscore	3:25
7.	"Love Again"	Colde (WAVY)	Colde (WAVY); Stally (WAVY)	Colde (WAVY); Stally (WAVY)	3:26
Total length:					23:45

== Charts ==
=== Weekly charts ===
Weekly chart performance for Delight
Chart (2020–2021)	Peak position
Hungarian Albums (MAHASZ)	30
Japanese Albums (Oricon)	9
Japanese Hot Albums (Billboard Japan)	6
Polish Albums (ZPAV)	23
Slovak Albums (ČNS IFPI)	68
South Korean Albums (Gaon)	1
UK Album Downloads (Official Charts)	11
US Heatseekers Albums (Billboard)	13
US World Albums (Billboard)	5

=== Year-end charts ===
2020 year-end chart performance for Delight
Chart (2020)	Position
South Korean Albums (Gaon)	7

== Certifications and sales ==
Sales certifications for Delight
Region	Certification	Certified units/sales
Japan	—	9,778
South Korea (KMCA)	Million	1,031,993

== Awards and nominations ==
Awards and nominations
Year	Organization	Award	Nominated work	Result	Ref.
2020	Gaon Chart Music Awards	Album of the Year - 2nd Quarter	Delight	Won	
2020	Gaon Chart Music Awards	Song of the Year - May	"Candy"	Nominated	
2020	Melon Music Awards	Album of the Year	Delight	Nominated	
2020	Melon Music Awards	Best R&B/Soul Award	"Candy"	Nominated	
2020	Melon Music Awards	Top 10 Digital Bonsang	"Candy"	Won	
2020	Mnet Asian Music Awards	Best Vocal Performance Solo	"Candy"	Nominated	
2020	Mnet Asian Music Awards	Song of the Year	"Candy"	Nominated	
2020	Mnet Asian Music Awards	Best Male Artist	"Candy"	Won	
2020	Mnet Asian Music Awards	Album of the Year	Delight	Nominated	

== Release history ==
Release history for Delight
Region	Date	Format	Label
South Korea	May 25, 2020	CD	SM; Dreamus
Various	May 25, 2020	Digital download; streaming	SM

== See also ==
- List of best-selling albums in South Korea
- List of K-pop songs on the Billboard charts
- List of K-pop albums on the Billboard charts
- List of Gaon Album Chart number ones of 2020
