= Losing a Friend =

"Losing A Friend"

Single by Nylon

from the album Nylon
- Released: May 2006 (Iceland) July 10, 2006 (UK)
- Genre: Pop
- Label: Believer

Iceland singles chronology
"Góðir Hlutir" (2005)	"Losing A Friend" (2006)	"Closer/Sweet Dreams" (2006)

Nylon singles chronology
"Losing A Friend" (2006)	"Closer/Sweet Dreams" (2006)

"Losing a Friend" is a Nylon single. It reached number one in Iceland.

== Track listings ==
1. Losing a Friend - 3.38
2. Give Me One Night - 4.11

== Videos ==
- Youtube
