= Li Tianyou (personality) =

Chinese Internet personality

Li Tianyou (Chinese: 李天佑; born August 7, 1990, also known as MC Tianyou) is a former Chinese MC and livestreamer. He is considered a controversial figure for his influence on Chinese youth for Hanmai culture.

His career started off on YY.com, where he gained fame for Hanmai and contributing to the popularization of the Chinese internet subculture. During his peak era, he gained over 20 million followers on YY and 40 million followers on Kuaishou at the time of his ban. In 2018, after Chinese national news channel CCTV exposed his actions of promoting and beautifying drugs during his broadcasting, Li Tianyou was permanently banned by all livestreaming and music platforms for breaking new regulations introduced by the Cyberspace Administration of China (CAC) in 2016.

== Early life and career ==
Tianyu was born and raised in Jinzhou.

In 2014, he started livestreaming on YY, and later gained fame for his talent for Hanmai. By 2016, he was the number 1 livestreamer on YY and kept dominating through 2017.

He also released several music tracks, and starred in multiple web movies and TV shows.

In 2018, he was banned due to bad influence on Chinese youth.

== Achievement ==
He is deemed as a leading figure for contributing to Hanmai culture. During his peak era, he won best male MCs on YY twice, in 2014 and 2015. In 2016, he was awarded Hottest Livestreamer by SoHu Fashion awards, and also awarded Top 10 Livestreamer by Weibo. In 2017, he was awarded Most Influential Crossover Livestreamer by Netease.

== Discography ==
- Future (2015)
- You don't love me that much (2016)
- Man is tough (2016)

== Filmography ==
- Run, Underwear (2016)
- Once upon a time in Northeast: Gangster Camp (2016)
- The potential (2016)
- Ren Jian Da Pao (2017)
- Da Lang Zhi Wo Ming You Ji (2017)
