= Nylon discography =

- Studio albums: 3
- Compilation albums: 1
- Singles: 12
- Video albums: 1

The discography of Icelandic girl group Nylon consists of three studio albums, one compilation and one DVD. They are Iceland's most successful singer/songwriter girl-band, producing twelve number one singles, three number one studio albums, one number one compilation and one number one DVD in Iceland.

== Albums ==
=== Studio albums ===
List of albums, with selected chart positions, sales, and certifications
Title	Album details	Peak chart positions	Track Listing
Title	Album details	Iceland	Track Listing
100% Nylon	Released: October 28, 2004; Label: Believer Music / Universal Music; Formats: CD, digital download	1	1. Lög Unga Fólsins; 2. Allstaðar; 3. Ertu Að Hlusta?; 4. . Get Ekki Meira; 5. Ég Komst Hingað Ein; 6. Sagan Segir; 7. Bara Í Nótt; 8. Fimm Á Richter; 9. Reyndu (Að Segja Hvað Þú Vilt); 10. Síðasta Sumar; 11. Einhversstaðar, Einhverntíma Aftur; 12. Einhversstaðar, Einhverntíma Aftur [Hip-Hop Version]
Góðir Hlutir	Released: November 10, 2005; Label: Believer Music / Universal Music; Formats: CD, digital download	1	1. Góðir Hlutir; 2. Andinn; 3. Bál; 4. Aðeins Nær; 5. Sjálfan Þig; 6. Ég Vil Vita Það; 7. Tætt; 8. Dans Dans Dans; 9. Einskonar Ást; 10. Nóttin
Nylon	Released : November 18, 2006; Label: Believer Music / Universal Music; Formats: CD, digital download	1	1. Closer; 2. Only You; 3. Losing A Friend; 4. Play On; 5. Summer's Gonna Come Again; 6. Last Summer; 7. You're Not Alone; 8. Everywhere; 9. Feel So Alive; 10. Give Me One Night; 11. Good Things; 12. Made It My Own; 13. Sweet Dreams

=== Compilation ===
List of albums, with selected chart positions, sales, and certifications
Title	Album details	Peak chart positions	Track Listing
Title	Album details	Iceland	Track Listing
Best Af Nylon	Released: November 21, 2007; Label: Believer Music / Universal Music; Formats: CD, digital download	1	1. Lög unga fólsins 2. Allsstaðar; 3. Bara í nót 4. Fimm á Richter; 5. Síðasta sumar 6. Einhversstaðar einhverntímann aftur 7. Furðuverk; 8. Góðir hlutir 9. Dans, dans, dans 10. Einskonar ást 11. Losing A Friend; 12. Closer; 13. Sweet Dreams; 14. Holiday; 15. Britney Sniglabandið og Nylon; 16. Superstar

== Singles ==
Year	Single	Peak		Album	Details
Year	Single	ICE	UK	Album	Details
2004	"Lög Unga Fólsins"	1	—	100% Nylon	Released: April 2004
2004	"Einhversstaðar, Einhverntíma Aftur"	1	—	100% Nylon	Released: May 2004
2004	"Allstaðar"	1	—	100% Nylon	Released: July 2004
2004	"Bara í nótt"	1	—	100% Nylon	Released: September 2004
2005	"Síðasta sumar"	1	—	100% Nylon	# Released: January 2005
2005	"Dans, Dans, Dans"	1	—	Góðir Hlutir	Released: May 2005
2005	"Góðir Hlutir"	1	—	Góðir Hlutir	Released: August 2005
2006	"Losing A Friend"	1	29	Nylon	Released: May 2006 [Iceland]; Released: July 10, 2006 [UK]
2006	"Closer"	1	64	Nylon	Released: August 2006 [Iceland]; Released: October 23, 2006 [UK]
2006	"Sweet Dreams"	1	64	Nylon	Released: August 2006 [Iceland]; Released: October 23, 2006 [UK]
2007	"Holiday"	1	—	Best Af Nylon	Released: April 2007
2007	"Shut Up"	1	—	Best Af Nylon	Released: August 2007

=== Promo singles ===
Ano	Song	Album
2004	"Get Ekki Meira"	100% Nylon
2004	"Fimm á Richter"	100% Nylon

== DVD ==
List of albums, with selected chart positions, sales, and certifications
Title	Album details	Peak chart positions
Title	Album details	Iceland
Nylon Allstaðar	Released: April 2, 2005; Label: Believer Music / Universal Music; Formats: CD, digital download	1
