= Hanmai =

Chinese internet subculture

Hanmai (Chinese: 喊麦) is a Chinese internet subculture that emerged in Northeast China during the 2000s and gained mainstream popularity in 2010.

In 2012, YY.com, the main platform for contributing to and popularizing the subculture, was launched.

Li Tianyou is considered a leading figure in Hanmai culture.

== History ==
Hanmai can be traced back to Errenzhuan culture which has similarities in the form of performance.

MC Shitou was one of the first internet sensations to emerge from the rise of online videos in 2008.

Other leading MCs includes MC Jiuju (7 million followers on YY), MC Azhe, and MC Gaodi.

== Style ==
Hanmai is similar to rap music. Hanmai lyrics usually revolve around simple stories of imaginary martial art heroes and ancient conquerors who are in love with beautiful people, accompanied by rhythm and beats downloaded from the internet.

== Social influence ==
Hanmai is deemed vulgar culture by Chinese mainstream. In 2018, the Cyberspace Administration of China (CAC) cracked down on Hanmai culture due to its bad influence on Chinese youth.
