= Candy (Baekhyun song) =

2020 single by Baekhyun

Single by Baekhyun

from the EP Delight
- Released: May 25, 2020
- Recorded: 2020
- Studio: SM LVYIN (Seoul); SM Yellow Tail (Seoul)
- Genre: R&B; Synth-pop
- Length: 3:48
- Label: SM; Dreamus
- Composers: Adrian McKinnon; Mike Daley; Mitchell Owens; Deez
- Lyricist: Kenzie
- Producers: Deez; Mike Daley; Mitchell Owens

Baekhyun singles chronology
"On the Road" (2020)	"Candy" (2020)	"Amusement Park" (2020)

Music video
- "Candy" on YouTube

"Candy" is a song recorded by South Korean singer Baekhyun. It was released on May 25, 2020, by SM Entertainment as the lead single of his second extended play, Delight (2020). The song was written by Kenzie, while composed by Adrian McKinnon, Mike Daley, Mitchell Owens and Deez. Musically, "Candy" is described as a "trendy" R&B and pop song with instrumentation from synthesizers. The lyrics are playful and compare Baekhyun to various types of candy.

Upon release, "Candy" received generally positive reviews from music critics, who praised its production and sound. Commercially, the song debuted at number 4 on the Gaon Digital Chart and charted at number 16 on the US World Digital Song Sales chart. An accompanying dance-oriented music video was released in conjunction with the song. Baekhyun promoted the song on various South Korean music programs including Music Bank and Inkigayo.

== Background and release ==
Baekhyun made his official debut as a solo artist in July 2019 with his first extended play City Lights, which peaked at number one on South Korea's Gaon Album Chart, and has sold over 570,000 copies in 2019. Following the success of City Lights, Baekhyun featured on Bolbbalgan4's "Leo", which peaked at number two on the Gaon Digital Chart. On April 22, 2020, SM Entertainment announced that Baekhyun's second EP Delight would be released on May 25. Delight was an instant success in the country, surpassing pre-order sales of 730,000 copies, and went onto debut at number one on the Gaon Album Chart.

"Candy" was released on May 25 for digital download and streaming in various countries by SM Entertainment, as the lead single of Delight. The song has lyrics written by Kenzie and music composed by Adrian McKinnon, Mike Daley, Mitchell Owens and Deez. It was arranged by the latter three with Yoo Young-jin.

== Composition ==
"Candy" was described as a "trendy" R&B song in a press release. Critics have described it as a hybrid of pop and R&B with elements of synth-pop. The upbeat song is instrumented by synthesizers and makes use of arpeggio chords in its production. The track also features electro sounds and a deep groove. The song sets a playful tone to the album. In terms of musical notation, the song is composed in the key of B minor, with a tempo of 150 beats per minute and is three minutes and forty seven seconds long. The lyrics are witty and playful in which Baekhyun compares his charms to various flavors of candy including, cinnamon, mint, strawberry and bubble gum. In a V Live broadcast, Baekhyun revealed that the track "offered relaxed listening, which is why [he] chose it [as the title track]."

== Music video and promotion ==
An accompanying music video for "Candy" was uploaded to SM Entertainment's official YouTube channel on May 25, 2020. It was preceded by two teasers released on the same platform on May 22 and 24. The video is choreography-heavy and features Baekhyun dancing in a neon-lit arcade. The visual opens with Baekhyun walking into the scene holding a skateboard. The following scene opens inside a candy store where he is seen enjoying sugary treats with his friends, before switching to show them dancing in an arcade. The clip alternates between sets of bright yellow, pink and purple colours where Baekhyun is seen hanging out and playing games with his friends or performing smooth choreography with them. The colourful setting of the video is a contrast to the black and white visuals of the music video of his song "UN Village" (2019). The music video became instantly popular, garnering over 10 million views in two days.

One hour before the album's release, Baekhyun held a live broadcast through Naver's V Live app to discuss the album, songs and production process. On May 26, Baekhyun shared his first performance of "Candy'" through Exo's official YouTube channel, as a part of the video-exclusive content series "BAEKHYUN The Stage". He promoted the song on various South Korean music programs starting with KBS's Music Bank on June 5, 2020. This was followed by performance on SBS's Inkigayo on June 7. On June 3, Baekhyun received his first music show trophy for "Candy" on MBC Music's Show Champion. He appeared as guest on June 3 episode of SBS Power FM's Cultwo Show. On June 5, he appeared on KBS Cool FM's Kang Han Na's Volume Up to promote the song.

Baekhyun launched a viral Internet video trend called the Candy Challenge with Kasper, who choreographed the dance for "Candy". The hashtag #CandyChallenge was used on popular social media platforms such as Twitter, TikTok and Instagram.

== Critical reception ==
"Candy" received generally favorable reviews from music critics. Chris Gillett of South China Morning Post wrote that the song is "built up by layers of soft-synths for an aptly sweet pop tune." Reviewing for Billboard, Rania Aniftos dubbed the song as "infectious."

In the singer's native country South Korea, Lee Honghyun of IZM praised the song's electronic production writing that it "is a good title track and kickoff for such works. The trendiness of the track's melody and highlight melody seems to be somewhat weak, but flexibly loosened the power to the dense groove.

== Commercial performance ==
Upon release, "Candy" attained commercial success in the singer's native country. The song topped the real-time charts of major Korean music platforms including Melon, Genie, Naver Music and VIBE. The song also debuted at number four on the Gaon Digital Chart, making it Baekhyun's fifth top-five entry on the chart. Additionally, the song topped the component Download Chart while peaking at number seventeen on the Streaming Chart.

The song also attained international success in North America, where it charted at number sixteen on Billboard's World Digital Songs chart. Furthermore, the song charted at number seven on the regional chart of Singapore and number thirty on the Billboard Japan Hot 100 chart.

== Accolades ==
Awards and nominations
Year	Organization	Award	Result
2020	Mnet Asian Music Awards	Song of the Year	Nominated
2020	Mnet Asian Music Awards	Best Vocal Performance Solo	Nominated

Music program awards
Program	Date	Ref.
Show Champion (MBC)	June 3, 2020	
Music Bank (KBS)	June 5, 2020	
Inkigayo (SBS)	June 7, 2020	

== Credits and personnel ==
Credits adapted from album's liner notes.

=== Studio ===
- SM LVYIN Studio – recording, digital editing, engineered for mix
- SM Yellow Tail Studio – recording
- SM Concert Hall Studio – mixing
- 821 Sound – mastering

=== Personnel ===
- SM Entertainment – executive producer
- Lee Soo-man – producer
- Baekhyun – vocals
- Kenzie – lyrics
- Mike Daley – composition, arrangement
- Mitchell Owens – composition, arrangement
- Deez – composition, arrangement, vocal directing
- Adrian McKinnon – composition, background vocals
- Yoo Young-jin – arrangement, music and sound supervisor
- Onestar – background vocals
- Lee Ji-hong – recording, digital editing, engineered for mix
- Noh Min-ji – recording
- Nam Koong-jin – mixing
- Kwon Nam-woo – mastering

== Charts ==
=== Weekly charts ===
Weekly chart performance for "Candy"
Chart (2020)	Peak position
Hong Kong (HKRIA)	24
Japan (Japan Hot 100)	32
Singapore (RIAS Regional)	7
South Korea (Gaon)	4
US World Digital Songs (Billboard)	16

=== Monthly charts ===
Monthly chart performance for "Candy"
Chart (June 2020)	Peak position
South Korea (Gaon)	30

== Release history ==
Release history and formats for "Candy"
Region	Date	Format	Label
South Korea	May 25, 2020	Digital download; streaming	SM; Dreamus
Various	May 25, 2020	Digital download; streaming	SM

== See also ==
- List of Inkigayo Chart winners (2020)
- List of Music Bank Chart winners (2020)
