= Closer/Sweet Dreams =

Single by Nylon

from the album Nylon
- Released: August 2006 (Iceland) October 16, 2006 (UK)
- Genre: Pop, Dance-pop
- Label: Believer

Nylon singles chronology
"Losing A Friend" (2006)	"Closer/Sweet Dreams" (2006)

"Closer/Sweet Dreams" is the second single from Nylon. It was a number-one hit in Iceland.

== Track listings ==
CD1

1. Closer - 3.33
2. Sweet Dreams [Uniting Nations Radio Edit] - 3.07

CD2

1. Closer - 3.33
2. Sweet Dreams - 3.41
3. Sweet Dreams [K-Klub Vocal Mix] - 7.24
4. Closer [Video]

== Promos ==
Sweet Dreams

1. United Nations Extended Mix - 7.00
2. K-Klub Vocal Mix - 7.24
3. Original Radio Edit - 3.43
4. United Nations Radio Edit - 3.08
5. K-Klub Radio Edit - 4.05

== Videos ==
- Closer on Youtube
- Sweet Dreams on Youtube
