= Liu Yuning =

Chinese singer and actor (born 1990)

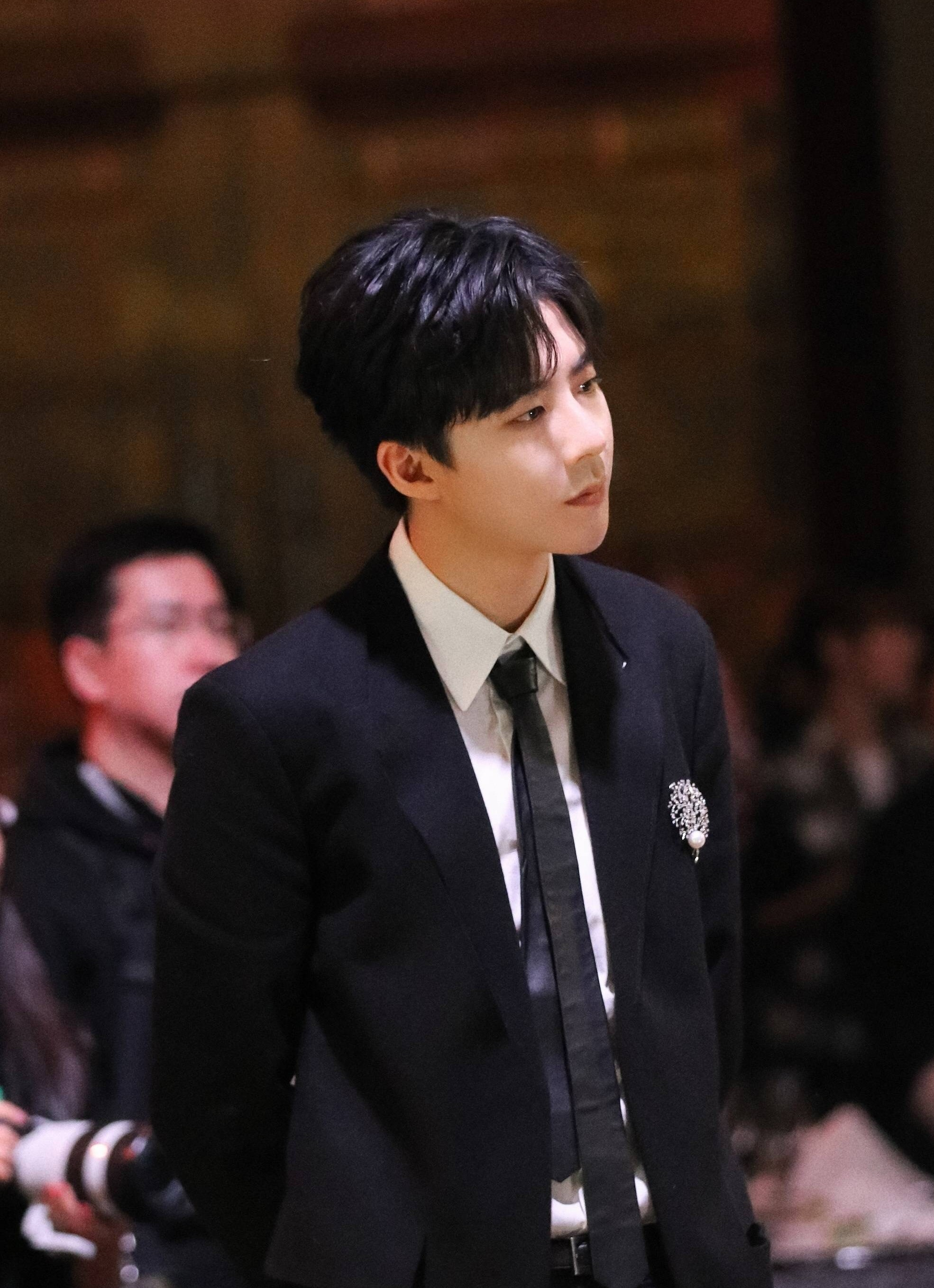
- Liu in 2020
- Born: January 8, 1990 (age 36); Dandong, Liaoning, China
- Occupations: Singer; actor; voice actor
- Years active: 2018–present
- Height: 190.5 cm (6 ft 3.0 in)
- Musical career
- Genres: Pop; C-pop; Mando-pop; Rock

Chinese name
- Traditional Chinese: 劉宇寧
- Simplified Chinese: 刘宇宁
Transcriptions
Standard Mandarin
- Hanyu Pinyin: Liú Yǔníng

Liu Yuning (simplified Chinese: 刘宇宁; traditional Chinese: 劉宇寧; pinyin: Liú Yǔníng; born January 8, 1990) is a Chinese singer, actor, and the lead singer of Modern Brothers. In 2018, Liu rose to stardom by his covers on platforms YY's Live Streaming and Douyin. Forbes China listed Liu on their 30 Under 30 Asia list in 2019. His debut album won the "Media Recommended Album" award at the 2020 Chinese Top Ten Music Awards, and his second extended play Listen•Ning (2020–21) won the "Most Popular EP" award in 2021 Chinese Top Ten Music Awards.

Outside of music, Liu also gained recognition as an actor through his roles in television series such as A Journey to Love in 2023, Story of Pearl Girl in 2024, and The Prisoner of Beauty, A Dream within a Dream in 2025.

== Early life ==
Liu was born in Dandong, Liaoning Province. His father died when he was 4 years old. His mother remarried and he grew up under his grandparents' care. Liu developed a passion for music from a young age, although his family's financial situation prevented him from pursuing formal music education or lessons, his love for music persisted.

Liu graduated from Dandong Vocational-Technical Secondary School where he received career training as a chef. He admitted he doesn't like to cook but chose to learn the skill so he could make a living early on and support his grandparents. He worked various temporary jobs as chef, waiter, and sales associate at fashion stores. Unwilling to abandon his initial dream of pursuing music, Liu used his first month's salary as a chef to buy a guitar. While working as a chef, he developed pneumothorax (collapsed lung), having no money to seek treatment, he could only lie in bed at home waiting for his time. Luckily, his boss at that time found out and lent him money for surgery. He later left his job as a chef due to this ailment. He began his musical journey as a singer at local bars. Subsequently, he formed the rock band Modern Brothers with his friends.

== Career ==
=== 2010–2017 ===
In 2010, Liu took part in Hunan Television's Super Boy, but was eliminated in the audition stage and failed to advance. He returned to the same competition in 2013 but was eliminated again in the second round of auditions. In 2014, Liu formed Modern Brothers band with A Zhuo and Da Fei, and joined the YY's live streaming platform in March 2015 where they covered dozens of songs. In 2016, he starred in the web film Class 952 produced by YY. In 2017 he moved his band's live streaming stage from indoors to outdoors, to a historical street market in his hometown, Dandong.

=== 2018–2019 ===
Liu Yuning and the Modern Brothers band rose to stardom after 3 years of live streaming (singing). Liu gained significant number of fans for his unique guttural singing voice. In July and August, Liu was invited to a number of television shows, including Hunan Television's Day Day Up and CCTV3's Setting Out for Happiness, but his first professional music stage performance was Jiangsu Television's Golden Melody 2.

On August 17, Liu and Modern Brothers held their first offline singing event at the exhibition center of Guangzhou Central Station. On September 15, Liu officially debuted as a solo singer with the release of his first solo single "Imagination." On October 19, Liu attended Zhejiang Television's Autumn Gala with his Modern Brothers band. In November, he participated in Jiangsu Television's Mask Singer. On December 31, he attended Jiangsu Television's 2019 New Year Concert. Liu landed his first drama acting role in the TV Series Hot-Blooded Youth starring Huang Zitao and Zhang Xueying which was filmed in September 2018 and aired a year later. He also sang OSTs for various films and TV series that year. Among them, the popular ones are "Toast the wine" (让酒) for Tomb of the sea (沙海) and the theme song for Jia Zhangke's film Ash Is Purest White.

In January, Liu was voted the "National Recommended Singer" to be a contestant as the challenger singer in Hunan Television's singing competition Singer 2019. On March 25, Liu won the Best New Artist and the Internet Influence Honor awards at the Chinese Top Ten Music Awards. His "Toast the Wine" was also awarded the Media Recommended OST. In March 2019, Liu participated as regular member in Hunan TV's variety show Our Brilliant Masters. In October, Liu participated as a regular member in the first season of Shanghai TV's music variety show Singing with Legends. As one of the eight young singers, he teamed up with older generation singer Richie Jen. Liu and Modern Brothers held their first concert tour in 5 cities from August to November; the last stop, planned to be held on February 14, 2020, in Wuhan, was postponed due to the COVID-19 pandemic. In December, Liu released his first solo studio album Ten (十).

=== 2020–2022 ===
In 2020, Liu performed his new single "Talking about Love" (你说爱情啊) at Chinese Top Ten Music Awards, where he also won the All-rounded Artist of the Year award, the People's Choice Singer Award, and the Media Recommended Album for Ten.

In 2021, Liu and Modern Brothers' 5 years contract with YY ended. They chose to leave the company, and Liu created his own artist studio with a few staff to manage his solo works. On March 21, Liu became the first Chinese pop singer to sing a Chinese theme song for Disney with the song "Magical Surprise" (奇妙的惊喜) for the 5th anniversary of Shanghai Disneyland. In October, Liu returned as a regular member in season three of Shanghai TV's music show Singing with Legends, where he teamed up with Penny Tai. In November, Liu again won the All-rounded Artist of the Year award, the Internet Influential Male Singer award, and the Most Popular EP award for his second EP "Listen∙Ning" at the Chinese Top Ten Music Awards. Liu also released more than 30 OSTs for various TV series, movies, documentaries, and video games, including "Heavenly Questions" (天问) for the TV series Word of Honor, which won topped Tencent Music UNI Chart for three consecutive weeks.

In the summer of 2022, Liu released "Looking for you", the theme song for the TV series Love Between Fairy and Devil, which won him 4 consecutive champions in TenCent Music Billboard. Besides his music career, he gained growing recognition for acting through dramas. His popular roles included Hei Yanjing in TV series Ultimate Note, Hao Du in TV series The Long Ballad, and Bai Choufei in drama Heroes. Liu continued to regularly livestream on his Weibo page, where each session can last for 2–5 hours. He mentioned that livestream is a bridge for him to sing and communicate with his fans. He mostly performs live without his band members too as they're now focusing on family, but the group hasn't disbanded and they're still close to each other, hence his introduction will always be "Modern Brother's Liu Yuning."

== Personal life ==
On March 27, 2023, paparazzo Deng Yangyang revealed that Liu had previously been married between April 2012 and December 2013. Within two hours, Liu, who was in costume while filming a drama, began a livestream confirming the marriage but clarifying that they did not have a child together and that he was no longer in contact with his ex-wife. Liu also condemned the paparazzo for publicizing images of his ex-wife and her child, whom was not related to him.

== Discography ==
=== Studio albums ===
- Ten (十) (2019)
- Liu Yuning's (刘宇宁的) (2025)

== Filmography ==
Liu has starred in films such as Line Walker 2: Invisible Spy and television series such as Ultimate Note, The Long Ballad, Medal of the Republic, Legend of Anle, A Journey to Love, The Prisoner of Beauty, A Dream Within a Dream, and so on. He has also appeared on numerous variety shows.

== Concert tours ==
=== 2019 Modern Brothers Concert Tour "Growing Storm" ===
Concert dates
| Date | City | Country | Venue |
|---|---|---|---|
| August 17, 2019 | Beijing | China | MasterCard Center |
| August 18, 2019 | Beijing | China | MasterCard Center |
| August 31, 2019 | Shanghai | China | Mercedes-Benz Arena |
| October 26, 2019 | Chengdu | China | Wuliangye Chengdu Performing Arts Centre |
| November 9, 2019 | Guangzhou | China | Guangzhou Haixinsha Park |
| November 30, 2019 | Dalian | China | Dalian Sports Centre Stadium |

Originally scheduled for 7 shows, on January 22, 2020, Liu Yuning announced on his personal Weibo that the concert in Wuhan will be postponed due to severe COVID-19 epidemic and to ensure everyone's health and safety. The rescheduled performance time will be notified separately. Tickets sold remains valid after postponement and rescheduling.

=== 2025 Liu Yuning Concert Tour "Liu Yuning's" ===
| Date | City | Country | Venue |
|---|---|---|---|
| July 19, 2025 | Shenzhen | China | Shenzhen Universiade Sports Centre |
| July 20, 2025 | Shenzhen | China | Shenzhen Universiade Sports Centre |
| August 2, 2025 | Wuhan | China | Optics Valley International Tennis Center |
| August 3, 2025 | Wuhan | China | Optics Valley International Tennis Center |
| September 26, 2025 | Shanghai | China | Mercedes-Benz Arena |
| September 27, 2025 | Shanghai | China | Mercedes-Benz Arena |
| October 25, 2025 | Xi'an | China | Xi'an Olympic Sports Center Gymnasium |
| November 15, 2025 | Beijing | China | Wukesong Arena (aka Lesports Center) |
| November 16, 2025 | Beijing | China | Wukesong Arena (aka Lesports Center) |
| December 20, 2025 | Dalian | China | Dalian Sports Centre Stadium |
| January 10, 2026 | Chengdu | China | Chengdu Dong'an Lake Sports Park |
| January 11, 2026 | Chengdu | China | Chengdu Dong'an Lake Sports Park |
| March 14, 2026 | Hangzhou | China | Hangzhou Olympic Sports Center |
| March 15, 2026 | Hangzhou | China | Hangzhou Olympic Sports Center |
| April 2026 | Nanjing | TBC | |

Hangzhou and Nanjing are the host cities of Liu's upcoming concerts. More shows are being scheduled. Details are to be confirmed.

== Awards and nominations ==
As a singer and actor, Liu has received awards and nominations for both his music and performances.

== Endorsements and ambassadorships ==
| Year | Brand | Title | Ref. |
|---|---|---|---|
| 2019 | Lay's | Brand Ambassador | |
| 2019 | Dr.Ci:Labo | Brand Ambassador | |
| 2019 | MartiDerm | Brand Ambassador in Greater China | |
| 2019 | Dr.Ci:Labo | Brand Spokesperson for Asia-Pacific Region | |
| 2020 | REVLON | Brand Ambassador | |
| 2020 | REVLON | Brand Spokesperson of PHOTOREADY Series | |
| 2020 | Oral-B | Brand Ambassador | |
| 2020 | Safeguard | Brand Ambassador | |
| 2020 | IPSA Infusha | Skincare Ambassador | |
| 2020 | IPSA Infusha | Cleansing Milk Spokesperson | |
| 2020 | Head & Shoulders | Brand Ambassador | |
| 2020 | Mengniu Chunzhen Yoghurt | Brand Ambassador | |
| 2021 | OLAY Body Care | Brand Ambassador | |
| 2021 | Nescafe | Brand Ambassador of Dolce Gusto Coffee Machine | |
| 2021 | Crest | Brand Ambassador | |
| 2021 | L'Oreal Paris | Hair Care Ambassador | |
| 2021 | Pomellato | Brand Friend | |
| 2021 | German Fortenberg WMF | First Brand Spokesperson in China | |
| 2021 | Kobayashi Pharmaceutical | Spokesperson for Kobayashi Warm Baby | |
| 2021 | OLAY Body Care | Diamond Brand Spokesperson | |
| 2022 | L'Oreal Paris | Modern Spokesperson | |
| 2022 | Mengniu Chunzhen Yoghurt | Brand Spokesperson | |
| 2022 | L'Oreal Paris | Skin Care Spokesperson | |
| 2022 | L'Oreal Paris | Hair Ambassador | |
| 2022 | Givenchy | Beauty Ambassador | |
| 2023 | Givenchy | Make Up Spokesperson | |
| 2023 | Pomellato | Brand Ambassador | |
| 2023 | Pomellato | Brand Zhuoyun Spokesperson | |
| 2024 | L'Oreal Paris | Brand Spokesperson | |
