= Song Zu'er =

Chinese actress (born 1998)

- 宋祖儿
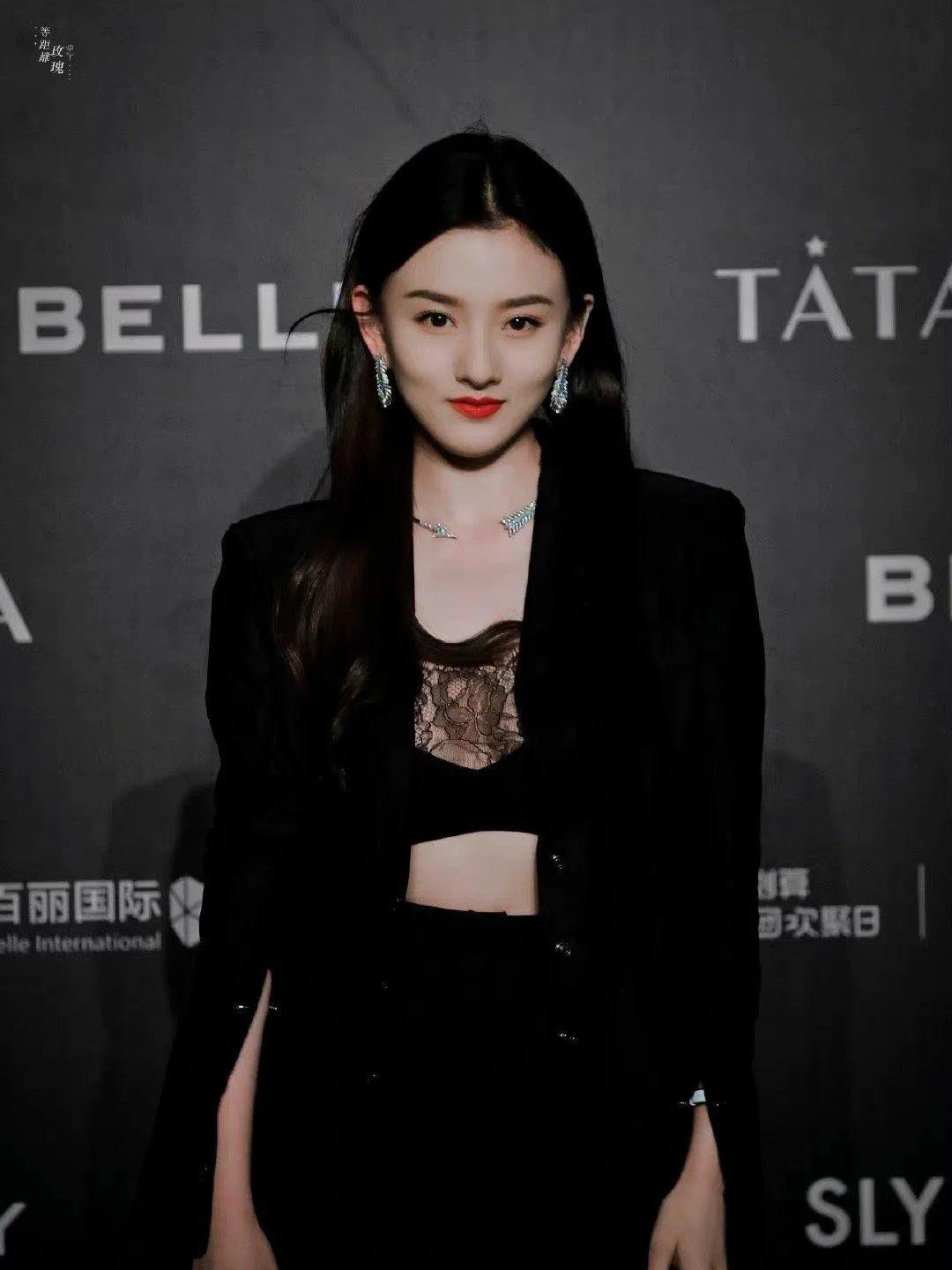
- Song in 2021
- Born: Sun Fanqing; May 23, 1998 (age 28); Tianjin, China
- Other names: Lareina Song; Juan Juan
- Education: Beijing Film Academy
- Occupations: Actress; model; singer
- Years active: 2005–2023; 2025–present
- Agent: Song Zu'er Studio
- Awards: Full list

Chinese name
- Traditional Chinese: 宋祖兒
- Simplified Chinese: 宋祖儿
- Hanyu Pinyin: Sòng Zǔ'er
- Wade–Giles: Sung Tsu'-erh

Song Zu'er (Chinese: 宋祖儿; born May 23, 1998), born Sun Fanqing (Chinese: 孙凡清), also known as Lareina Song, is a Chinese actress and singer. She made her debut as a child actress in the television series The Sea and Sky Boundless (2005). She gained attention with reality show Divas Hit the Road (Season 3) in 2017, followed by TV dramas such as Novoland: Eagle Flag (2019), Guardians of the Ancient Oath (2020), The Bond (2021), To Fly with You (2021), Cupid's Kitchen (2022), Legally Romance (2022), and The Prisoner of Beauty (2025).

== Early life ==
Song was born in Tianjin, China. After completing the first grade of elementary school in Tianjin, she moved to Beijing with her mother to continue her education. At elementary school, Song began her acting career as a child actor with a supporting role in TV drama The Sea and Sky Boundless (2005). She appeared in a song and dance show at the 2007 CCTV New Year's Gala and gained recognition for playing Nezha in television series Prelude of Lotus Lantern (2009).

Song graduated from middle school in Beijing in 2013, but was unable to take the national high school entrance exam because her talent agency had used her stage name for her school registration, and returned to Tianjin for her first year of high school. In 2014 she made arrangements to study abroad at her own expense, handing all details by herself. She attended Oakwood Friends School in the United States, graduating in 2017.

She then returned to China, where she continued her acting career while preparing for college examinations. She was admitted to the acting department of the Beijing Film Academy in 2018 after scoring third-highest in the entrance exam, and by graduation had transitioned her public image from child actor to adult roles.

== Career ==
While in the United States, Song performed opposite Xia Yu in the 2016 comedy film Papa. After returning to China, her appearance in the reality show Divas Hit the Road (Season 3) in 2017 gained her significant attention, leading to roles in a series of TV dramas, films, and variety shows. In 2018 she played lead roles in the fantasy historical drama The Dark Lord, as well as the comedy web series Gossip High. In 2019, Song starred in the fantasy epic drama Novoland: Eagle Flag. The same year, she was cast in the romance comedy drama Cupid's Kitchen. Forbes China listed Song under their 30 Under 30 Asia 2019 list, which consisted of 30 influential people under 30 years old who have had a substantial effect in their fields.

Song appeared in the 2020 CCTV New Year's Gala, acting in a comedy sketch. She then starred in TV dramas, such as Guardians of the Ancient Oath (2020), The Bond (2021), To Fly with You (2021), Cupid's Kitchen (2022), and Legally Romance (2022), until her career was derailed by an alleged tax evasion in 2023. In August 2024, Song's studio stated that she had been cleared by the tax authorities following an investigation.

On April 3, 2025, the film One and Only (2023), in which Song appeared, was re-released in China with her scenes intact. On April 12, her comeback drama The Demon Hunter's Romance premiered on iQIYI.

== Controversy ==
=== Poster plagiarism ===
In March 2021, Song's team posted on Weibo a collage of photos of her holding a bouquet of lilies against a background that looks like the bottom page of a magazine with a corner ripped out to reveal a price sticker. The poster, however, was pointed out to have plagiarized from South Korean idol Baekhyun's 2019 EP City Lights. Song's photographer issued an apology, acknowledging the plagiarism, after which Song's team issued a follow-up apology and removed the plagiarized poster.

=== Tax evasion allegations ===
On August 31, 2023, Song was reportedly accused by a former employee at her office of evading up to 45 million yuan in taxes (6.5 million US dollars). The same day the State Administration of Taxation stated that tax investigation will be carried out, and details will be shared on its official website. Following the allegation, China's major TV stations removed Song's mention in their social media. On August 27, 2024, Song's office issued a statement via Weibo, clarifying that, following an investigation by the tax authorities, Song was found to have committed no tax evasion and has not been subject to any administrative penalties for tax-related matters.

== Filmography ==
=== Film ===
| Year | Title | | Role | Notes | Ref. |
| Year | English | Chinese | Role | Notes | Ref. |
|---|---|---|---|---|---|
| 2007 | You Are An Angel | 你是天使 | Xiao Hua | | |
| 2016 | Papa | 洛杉矶捣蛋计划 | Coco | | |
| 2017 | What A Day! | 有完没完 | Young girl | Cameo | |
| 2019 | Blast into the Past | 熊出没·原始时代 | Feifei | Voice-dubbed | |
| 2019 | Zhui Ji | 坠机 | Sanshi | Short film | |
| 2023 | One and Only | 热烈 | Li Mingzhu | | |

=== Television series ===
| Year | Title | | Network | Role | Notes | Ref. |
| Year | English | Chinese | Network | Role | Notes | Ref. |
|---|---|---|---|---|---|---|
| 2005 | Love of Fate | 青城之恋 | | Zhao Yuyang | | |
| 2005 | Secret Order 1949 | 密令1949 | CCTV | Er Nizi | | |
| 2005 | The Sea and Sky Boundless | 海阔天高 | | Tong Yao | | |
| 2011 | Prelude of Lotus Lantern | 宝莲灯前传 | CCTV | Nezha | | |
| 2011 | Wu Liang Tian | 无量天 | | Lin Ruoxue | | |
| 2013 | Lucky Rabbit Spirit | 幸运兔精灵 | | Lucky | | |
| 2017 | Boy Hood | 我们的少年时代 | Hunan TV | Sha Wan | | |
| 2018 | The Dark Lord | 夜天子 | Tencent Video | Xia Yingying | | |
| 2018 | Gossip High | 舌害 | iQIYI | Yao Yiyao | | |
| 2019 | Novoland: Eagle Flag | 九州缥缈录 | Zhejiang TV | Yu Ran | | |
| 2020 | Guardians of the Ancient Oath | 山海经之上古密约 | Hunan TV | Baili Hongyi | | |
| 2021 | The Bond | 乔家的儿女 | Jiangsu TV, Zhejiang TV | Qiao Simei | | |
| 2021 | To Fly with You | 陪你逐风飞翔 | Hunan TV | Shen Zhengyi | | |
| 2022 | Cupid's Kitchen | 舌尖上的心跳 | Beijing TV | Lin Kesong | | |
| 2022 | Pride and Price | 盛装 | Youku | Li Na | | |
| 2022 | Legally Romance | 才不要和老板谈恋爱 | Tencent Video | Qian Wei | | |
| 2025 | The Demon Hunter's Romance | 无忧渡 | iQIYI | Ban Xia | | |
| 2025 | The Prisoner of Beauty | 折腰 | Tencent Video | Qiao Man | | |
| 2025 | Created in China | 艰难的制造 | CCTV, Tencent Video, iQIYI | Cui Bingbing | | |
| TBA | Wish You All the Best | 表妹万福 | Tencent Video | Zhen Jiafu | | |
| TBA | Liao Zhai | 聊斋 | Tencent Video | Grandma | | |
| TBA | The Palace Stewardess | 司宫令 | Tencent Video | Wu Zhenzhen | | |
| TBA | Reading Class | 阅读课 | Youku | Wu Jiashu | | |
| TBA | Enter the Game | 入局 | iQIYI | | | |

=== Television shows ===
| Year | Title | | Network | Role | Notes | Ref. |
| Year | English | Chinese | Network | Role | Notes | Ref. |
|---|---|---|---|---|---|---|
| 2017 | Divas Hit the Road Season 3 | 花儿与少年第三季 | Hunan Broadcasting System | Cast member | | |
| 2019 | Forget Me Not Café | 忘不了餐厅 | Tencent Video | Cast member | | |
| 2019 | Chase Me | 追我吧 | Zhejiang Television | Cast member | | |
| 2020 | Forget Me Not Café Season 2 | 忘不了餐厅 (第二季) | Tencent Video | Cast member | | |
| 2021 | Heart Signal Season 4 | 心动的信号 (第四季) | Tencent Video | Cast member | | |
| 2022 | The Truth | 开始推理吧 | Tencent Video | Cast member | | |
| TBA | She Sees Through Everything | 看穿一切的她 | TBA | Cast member | | |

== Discography ==
=== Singles ===
| Year | English title | Chinese title | Album | Notes | Ref. |
|---|---|---|---|---|---|
| 2019 | "The Future Me" | 未来已来 | | Theme song for China's Communist Youth League | |
| 2019 | "My Motherland and I" | 我和我的祖国 | Youth for the Motherland Singing | For People's Republic of China's 70th anniversary | |
| 2019 | "The Best Summer" | 最好的夏天 | Youth for the Motherland Singing | For People's Republic of China's 70th anniversary | |
| 2019 | "Starry Sea" | 星辰大海 | | For China Movie Channel Young Actors Project with 31 other actors | |
| 2020 | "Classmate" | 同学 | | with Hou Minghao | |

== Awards and nominations ==
Name of the award ceremony, year presented, category, nominee of the award, and the result of the nomination
| Award ceremony | Year | Category | Nominee / Work | Result | Ref. |
|---|---|---|---|---|---|
| Weibo Fan Festival | 2017 | Powerstar Ranking New Artist | Song Zu'er | Won | |
| 11th Tencent Video Star Awards | 2017 | New Star Award | Song Zu'er | Won | |
| L'Officiel Fashion Night | 2018 | Influence Award | Song Zu'er | Won | |
| 15th Esquire China's Man At His Best Awards | 2018 | Quality Actor Award | Song Zu'er | Won | |
| Golden Bud - The Third Network Film And Television Festival | 2018 | Most Popular Actress | Song Zu'er | Won | |
| Golden Data Entertainment Award | 2019 | Most Commercially Valuable Artist | Song Zu'er | Won | |
| 6th The Actors of China Award Ceremony | 2019 | Best Actress | Novoland: Eagle Flag | Nominated | |
| 26th Huading Awards | 2019 | Best Actress (Historical Drama) | Novoland: Eagle Flag | Won | |
| Golden Bud - The Fourth Network Film And Television Festival | 2019 | Best Actress | Novoland: Eagle Flag | Nominated | |
| Cosmo Glam Night | 2019 | Person of the Year (Love) | Song Zu'er | Won | |
| iFeng Fashion Choice Awards | 2019 | Trend Figure of the Year | Song Zu'er | Won | |
| Sohu Fashion Awards | 2019 | Influential Female Star | Song Zu'er | Won | |
| 16th Esquire Man At His Best Awards | 2019 | Television Actress of the Year | Song Zu'er | Won | |
| Tencent Video All Star Awards | 2019 | Youth Artist of the Year | Song Zu'er | Won | |
| Tencent Entertainment White Paper | 2019 | Most Promising TV Actress | Song Zu'er | Won | |
| Weibo Awards Ceremony | 2020 | Rising Artist of the Year | Song Zu'er | Won | |
| 7th The Actors of China Award Ceremony | 2020 | Best Actress (Emerald) | Song Zu'er | Won | |
| Sohu Fashion Awards Gala | 2021 | Breakthrough Female Artist of the Year | Song Zu'er | Won | |
