= Ashina Zhong =

7th-century Tang dynasty general

Commander of Chang Prefecture
- Tenure: 634–637
- Predecessor: Ashina Sunishi
- Successor: Prefecture abolished
- Born: 611
- Died: 24 May 675 (aged 63–64); Luoyang, Tang dynasty
- Burial: 7 November 675; Zhao Mausoleum
- Spouse: County Princess of Dingxiang (定襄縣主)
- Issue: Ashina Jian (阿史那暕)
Names
- Ashina Nishu (阿史那泥孰); Ashina Zhong (阿史那忠)
Posthumous name
- Duke Zhen of Xue (薛貞公)
- House: Ashina
- Father: Ashina Sunishi

Ashina Zhong (611 – 24 May 675, Chinese: 阿史那忠; pinyin: Āshǐnà Zhōng), né Ashina Nishu (阿史那泥孰), also known as Shi Zhong (史忠), courtesy name Yijie (義節), posthumous name Duke Zhen of Xue (薛貞公), was an ethnic Göktürk military general of the Tang dynasty. His military career is mostly known from his stele and epitaph, as New Book of Tang mentions his life only briefly.

== Biography ==
He was a son of Ashina Sunishi, an Eastern Turkic prince, born during reign of Shibi Qaghan, in 611. His original name was Nishu. He was appointed as lesser qaghan during the reign of Illig Qaghan, receiving lands near Lingzhou. Following his father's defection to Chinese side, he was tasked with capturing Illig and bringing him to Chang'an in 630.

He was promoted by Taizong of Tang to Left Tunwei General and married the step-daughter of Taizong, Princess Dingxiang (daughter of Imperial Consort Wei Gui and her former husband) as his wife. He was bestowed the surname Shi (Chinese: 史, romanized: Shǐ) and name Zhong (Chinese: 忠, romanized: Zhōng, lit. 'Loyal') and was given a residence in Wannian County (present-day northwest Xi'an, Shaanxi), establishing the Shi clan of Wannian. After his father's death, in 635, he inherited the title of Duke of Xue, as well as took over his duties as acting Governor of Chang Prefecture in 637. He was appointed as Left Virtuous King in 639 under Qilibi Qaghan. He was described as melancholic and unhappy for returning to steppes again. He stepped down from this position by permission from Taizong and returned to court sometime later.

His next appointment was as Pacification Commissioner of the Xizhou Circuit in 644, when he went on mission to the Western Cities, coordinating with Anxi Protector Guo Xiaoke on Emperor Taizong's campaign against the Western Regions. According to Emperor Taizong's edict, in the Western Regions he "proclaimed [the emperor's] awesome virtue, recruited and accepted those who surrendered and submitted, inquired about their hardships and suffering, relieved their dangers and distress, and strove to exhaust the way of pacification and consolation," achieving good results.

He joined Emperor Taizong's campaign against Xueyantuo in 646 and was promoted to Right Military Guard Great General later. Following the death of Taizong, he successively held positions as Left Military Guard Great General and Right Xiaowei Great General during the Yonghui era. He was promoted to Grand Commander of Changling Circuit in 660, deployed against Tiele and Khitan tribes.

He served as Commander-in-chief of Qinghai Circuit army in 668, assisting Xue Rengui against Tibetan Empire. Two years later, Tibetan Empire allied with Tuyuhuns and attacked and tried to capture Kucha and other eighteen jimi prefectures in the Western Regions. He was ordered to transfer to the position of military and civilian commander of the region alongside Luo Binwang.

He died at his private residence in Shangshan Ward (Chinese: 尚善坊) in Luoyang on 24 May 675. He was posthumously granted the position of Zhenjun Great General (Chinese: 鎮軍將軍, romanized: Zhènjūn Jiāngjūn), given the posthumous name Zhen (Chinese: 貞), and buried as a companion tomb to Tang's Zhaoling Mausoleum. He left a son named Jian (Chinese: 暕, romanized: Jiǎn) who served as Crown Prince's Servant (Chinese: 太子仆, romanized: Tàizǐ pū) or Vice Minister of the Imperial Stud (Chinese: 太仆少卿, romanized: Tài pū shǎo qīng).

== Stele ==
The stele of Ashina Zhong was erected in 675. It was originally located about 50 meters southwest of Xizhou village in Yanxia, Liquan County, Shaanxi, in front of Ashina Zhong's tomb. In 1975, it was moved to the Zhaoling Museum in Xianyang, Shaanxi. The stele body measures 3.88 meters in height, 1.18 meters in width at the base, and 34 centimeters in thickness. The main text of the stele is in regular script, comprising 33 columns with 82 characters per full column. The characters at the lower end are relatively clear, while the rest are mostly worn and illegible.

== Tomb ==
The epitaph and cover were unearthed in June 1972 from the tomb of Ashina Zhong. Excavated tomb was previously looted. The epitaph cover is 15.5 cm thick and 76.5 cm long at the base. The epitaph stone is 76.5 cm long and 15.5 cm thick. The inscription is in regular script, written by Cui Xinggong, and consists of 44 lines, each with 44 characters. Also unearthed at the same time was the epitaph cover of his wife, Lady Li, Princess Dingxiang but the epitaph stone was missing. The epitaph cover is 9.5 cm thick and 64 cm long at the base. It is decorated with four auspicious symbols, but the upper right corner is missing. According to epitaph, Ashina Zhong's grandfather was named Yongzhou Qaghan (Chinese: 邕周, romanized: Yōngzhōu) and great-grandfather was called Dayuan (Chinese: 大原, romanized: Dàyuán). However, identities of these people were not established.

Murals from Ashina Zhong's tomb

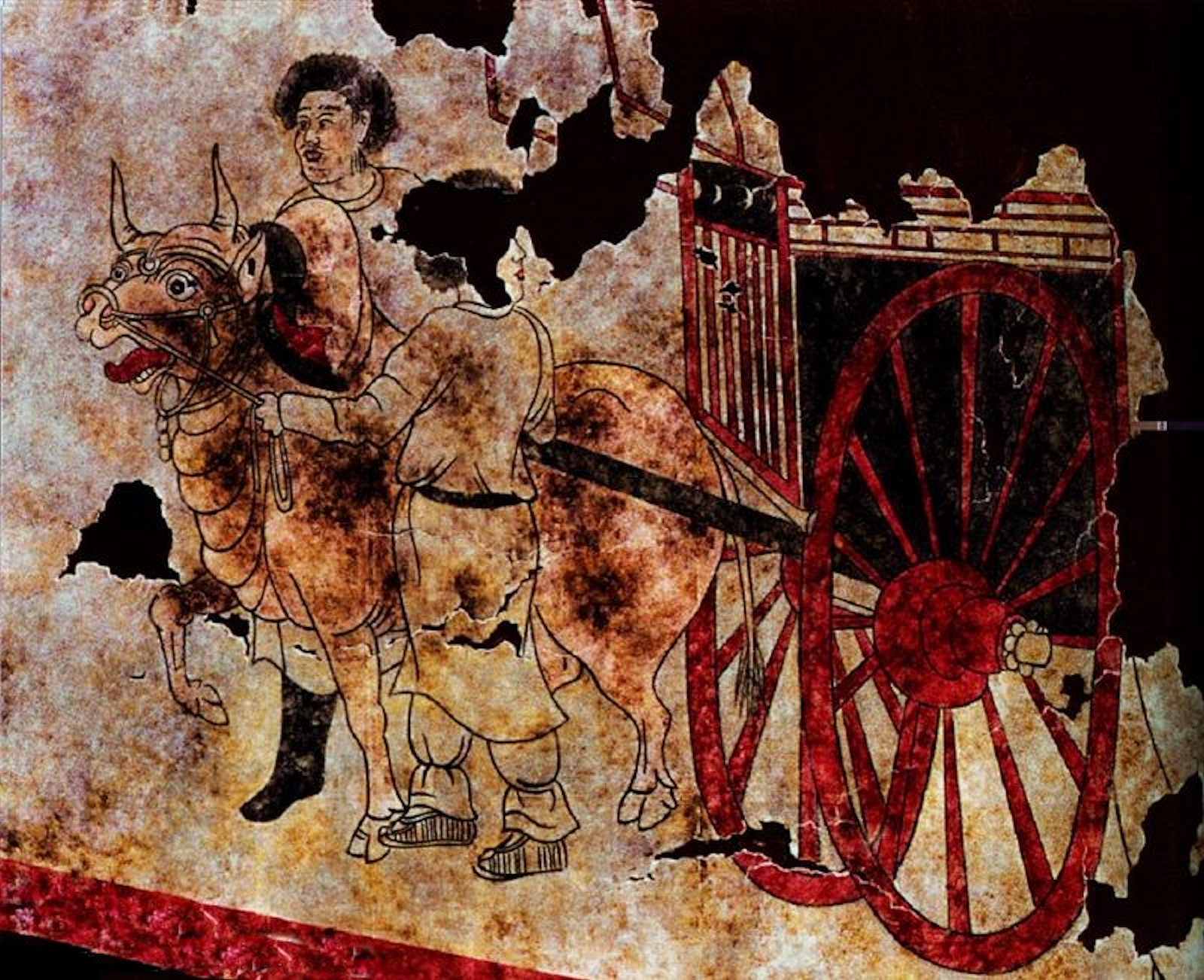
Cart scene from Ashina Zhong's tomb

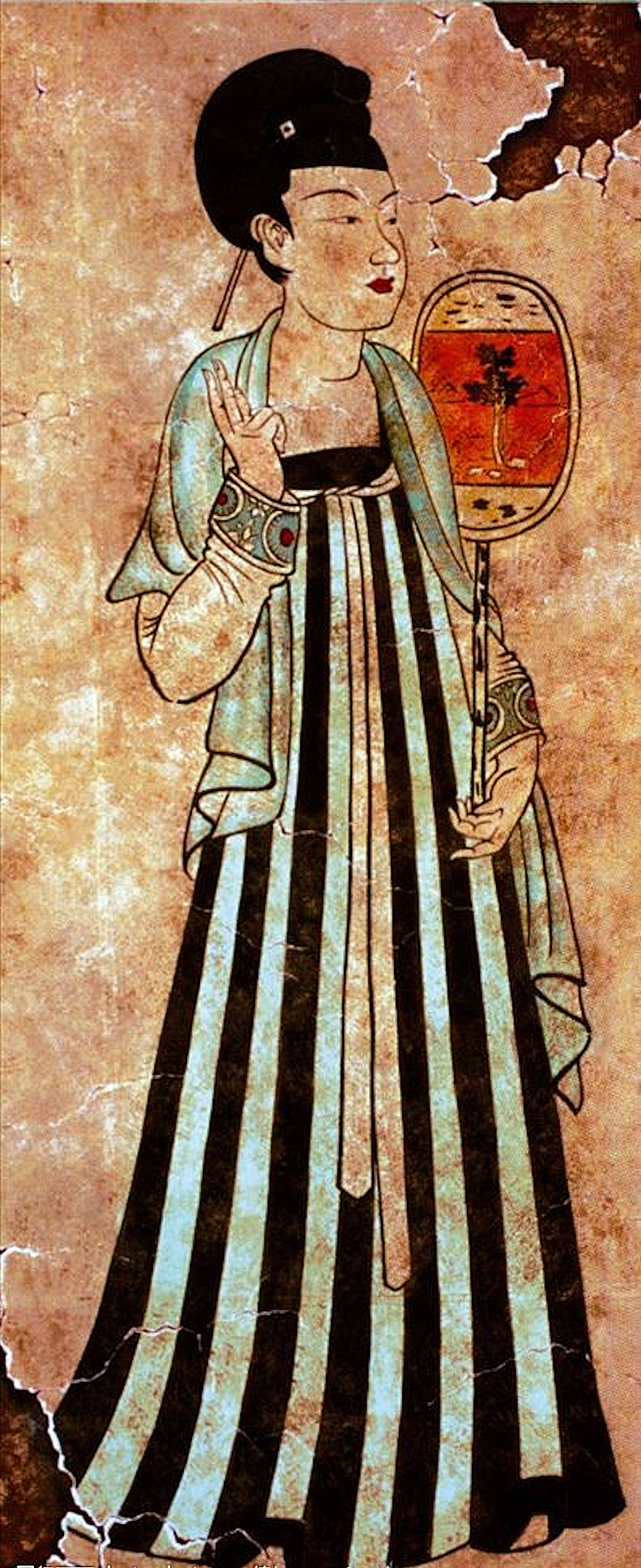
Lady with a fan

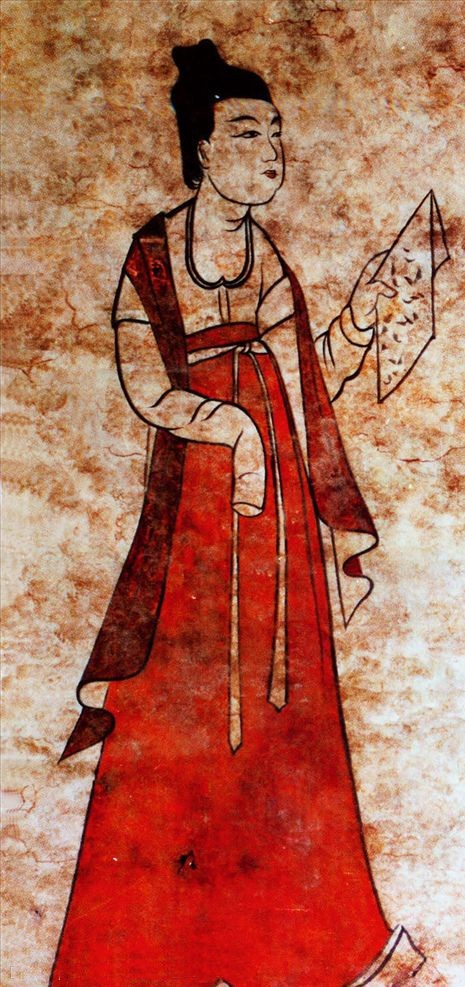
Lady with a letter

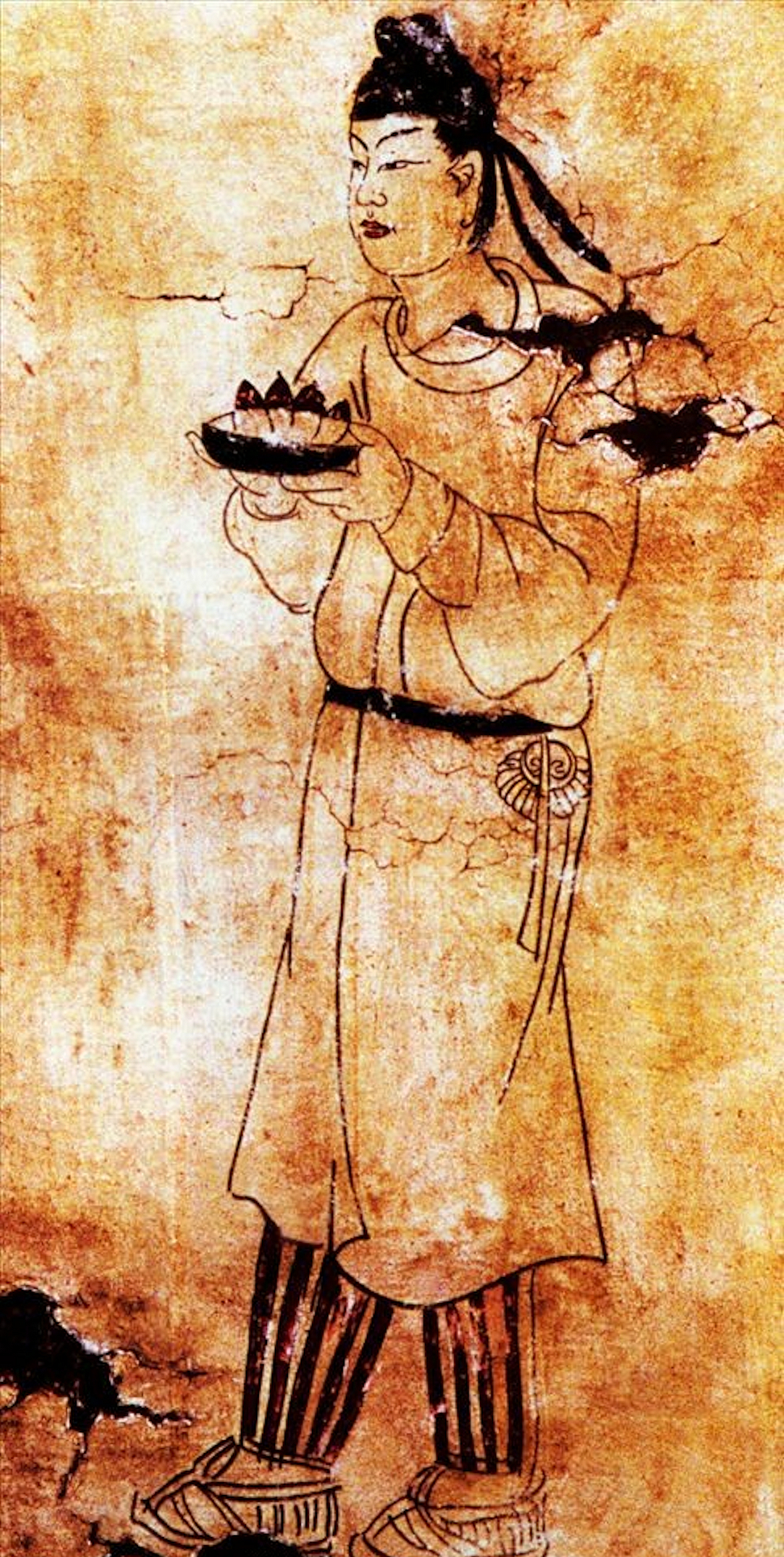
Male courtier

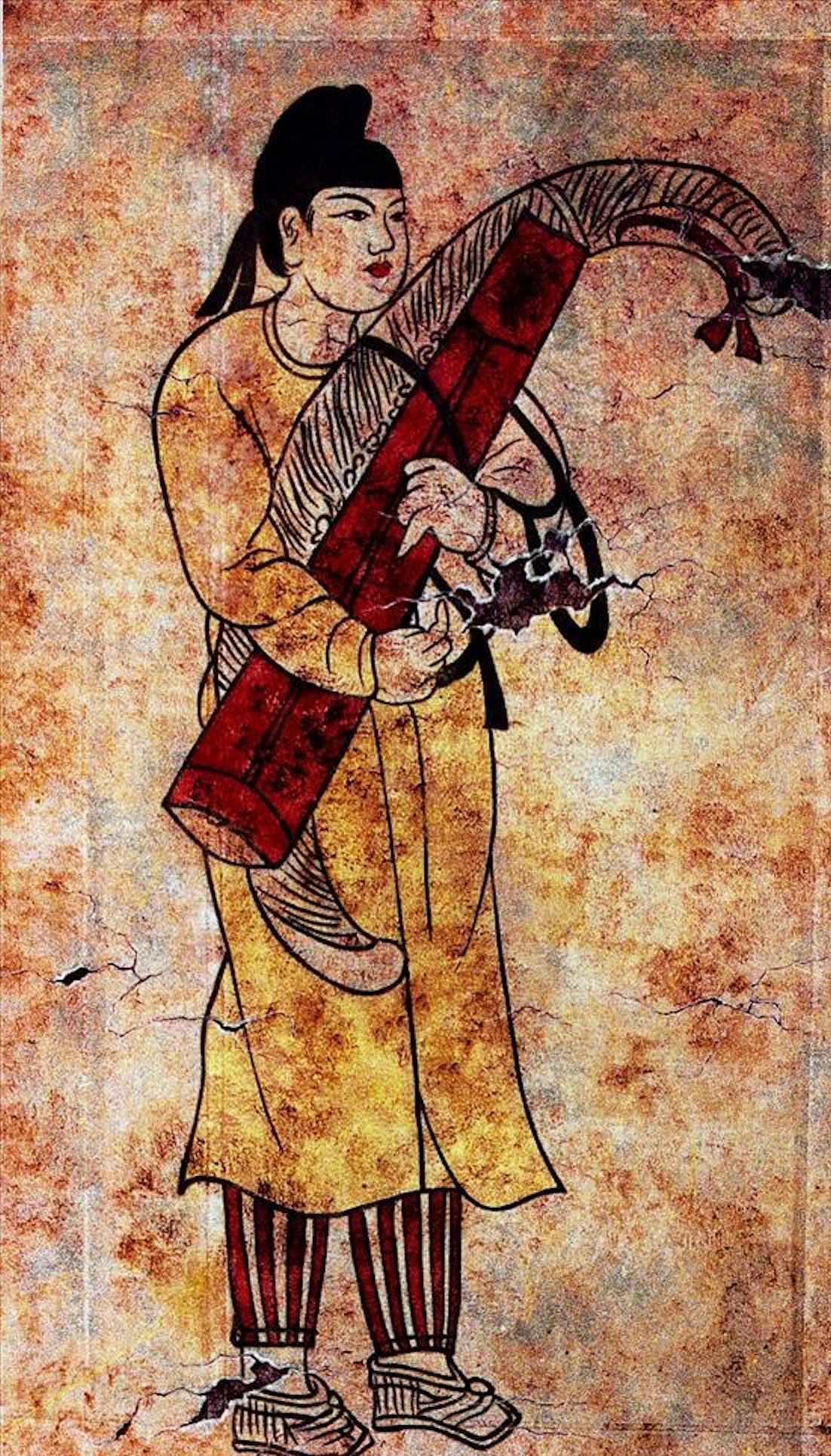
Musician

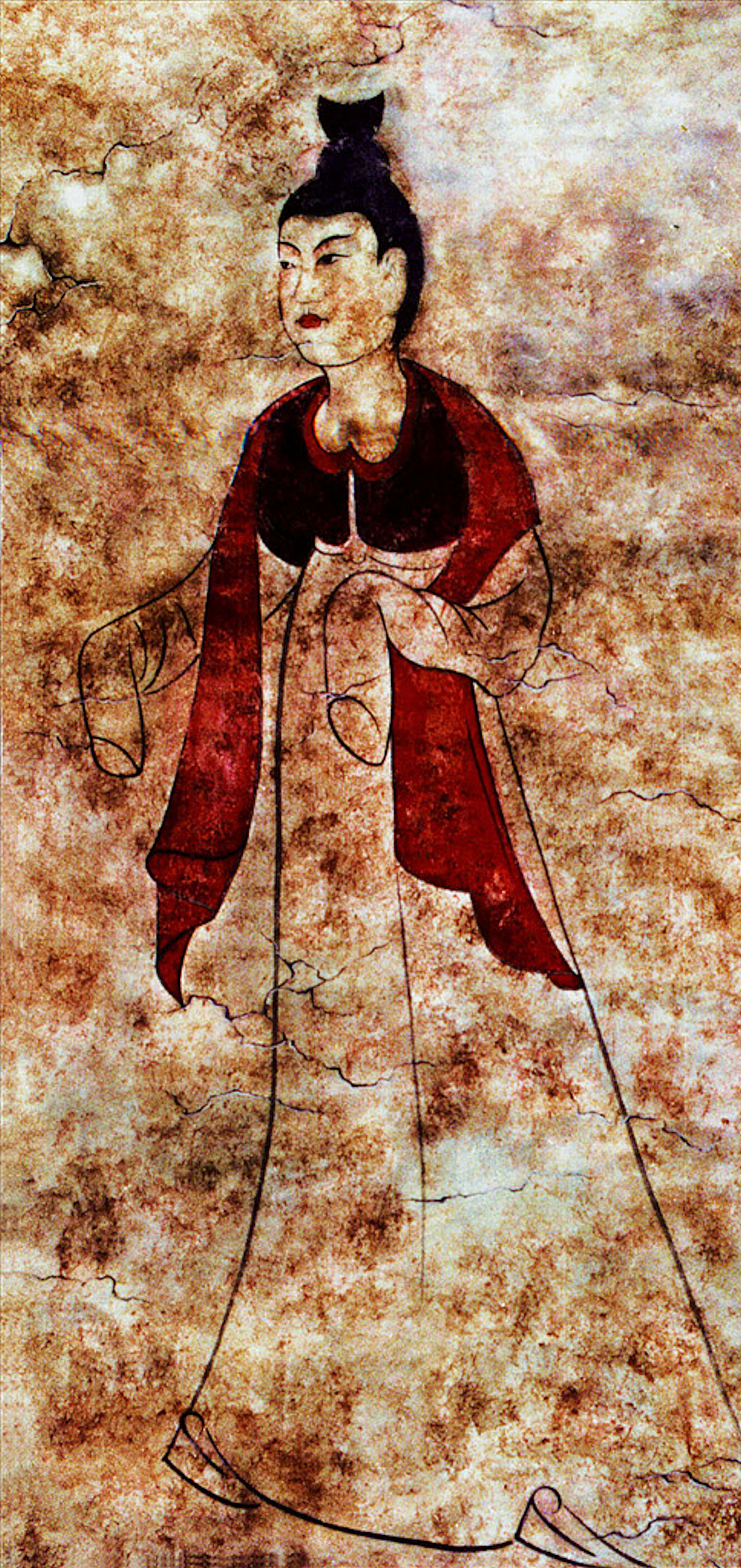
A lady

== Portrayal in media ==
- He was portrayed by Leo Wu in the historical drama The Long Ballad (2021), but his name was changed to Ashile Sun (Chinese: 阿詩勒隼, romanized: Āshīlēi Sǔn).

== Sources ==
- New Book of Tang, Volume 110, Chapter 35 (in Chinese)
- Old Book of Tang, Volume 109 (in Chinese)
