= Papa (2016 film) =

2016 comedy film

- Theatrical poster
- Chinese: 洛杉矶捣蛋计划
- Directed by: Xiao Zheng
- Written by: Yang Hu; Xiao Zheng
- Based on: 파파 by Han Ji-seung
- Produced by: Alina Y. Qiu; Michael Peyser
- Starring: Xia Yu; Song Zuer; David Wu; Yang Zi; Dennis Oh
- Cinematography: Andrew Jeric
- Music by: Deon Lee
- Production company: Jampa Films
- Distributed by: China Film Group; United Entertainment Partners
- Release date: March 18, 2016
- Running time: 106 minutes
- Country: China
- Languages: Mandarin, English

Papa (Chinese: 洛杉矶捣蛋计划) is a 2016 Chinese family comedy-drama, a dramedy film directed by Xiao Zheng starring lead actor Xia Yu. The film was entirely shot in Los Angeles and Las Vegas and was released theatrically in China and the United States on the same day.

== Synopsis ==
A bumbling Chinese talent manager travels to Los Angeles to retrieve his singer who fled to elope mid-tour. Instead of retrieving his singer, his futile attempts land him in an arranged marriage with five adopted kids and an angry boss demanding his investment back. In his quest to reclaim fame and fortune, papa learns an important lesson in what it means to be a family.

The film follows a plot similar to a 2012 South Korean film, also named Papa.

== Cast ==
- Xia Yu as Huang Bo Lun
- Song Zuer as Coco
- Chloe Perrin as Alice
- Sage Correa as A.K.
- Jake Elliott as Peter
- Anjini Taneja Azhar as Katie
- Yang Zi
- David Wu
- Mike Sui Kai
- Shan Jiang
- Hu Bing
- Macy Gray
- Emily Kinney
- Dennis Oh as Jason Chen
- Candice Zhao
- Brother Sway
