= Xia Da =

Chinese comics artist

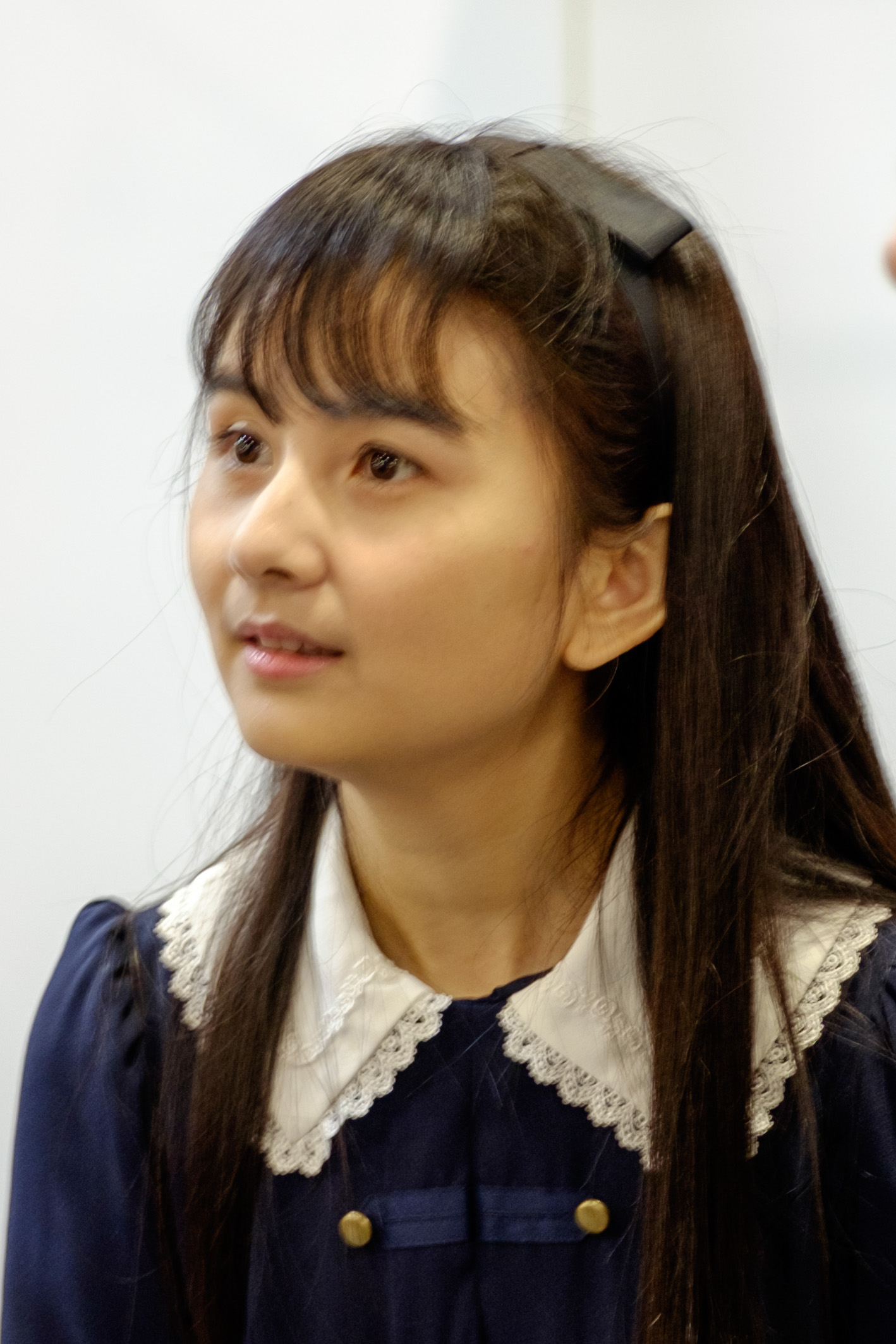
- Xia Da in 2016
- Born: 4 April 1981 (age 45) Huaihua, Hunan, China
- Area: Manhua artist
- Notable works: Zi Bu Yu, Chang Ge Xing
- Awards: Golden Dragon Award, Golden Monkey Award

Xia Da (Chinese: 夏达; born 4 April 1981) is a Chinese manhua artist. She is best known for creating the comics Zi Bu Yu and Chang Ge Xing. Five million copies of her works have been sold as of 2018. Her art has been noted for its classical style, and has been met with positive reception in both China and Japan.

== Early life ==
Xia Da was born on 4 April 1981, in Huaihua, Hunan Province. Her interests had included painting and comic-reading since she was a child, and she was eventually inspired to make her own comics in high school. She published her first work, titled Cheng Zhang, in the Beijing Cartoon magazine, receiving an encouraging, handwritten reply by her editorial teacher. After graduating from university, she moved to Beijing and briefly worked in advertising before quitting to focus on her own comics. During this time, she became engrossed in drawing, seldom leaving her apartment as she lived on a modest income.

== Career ==
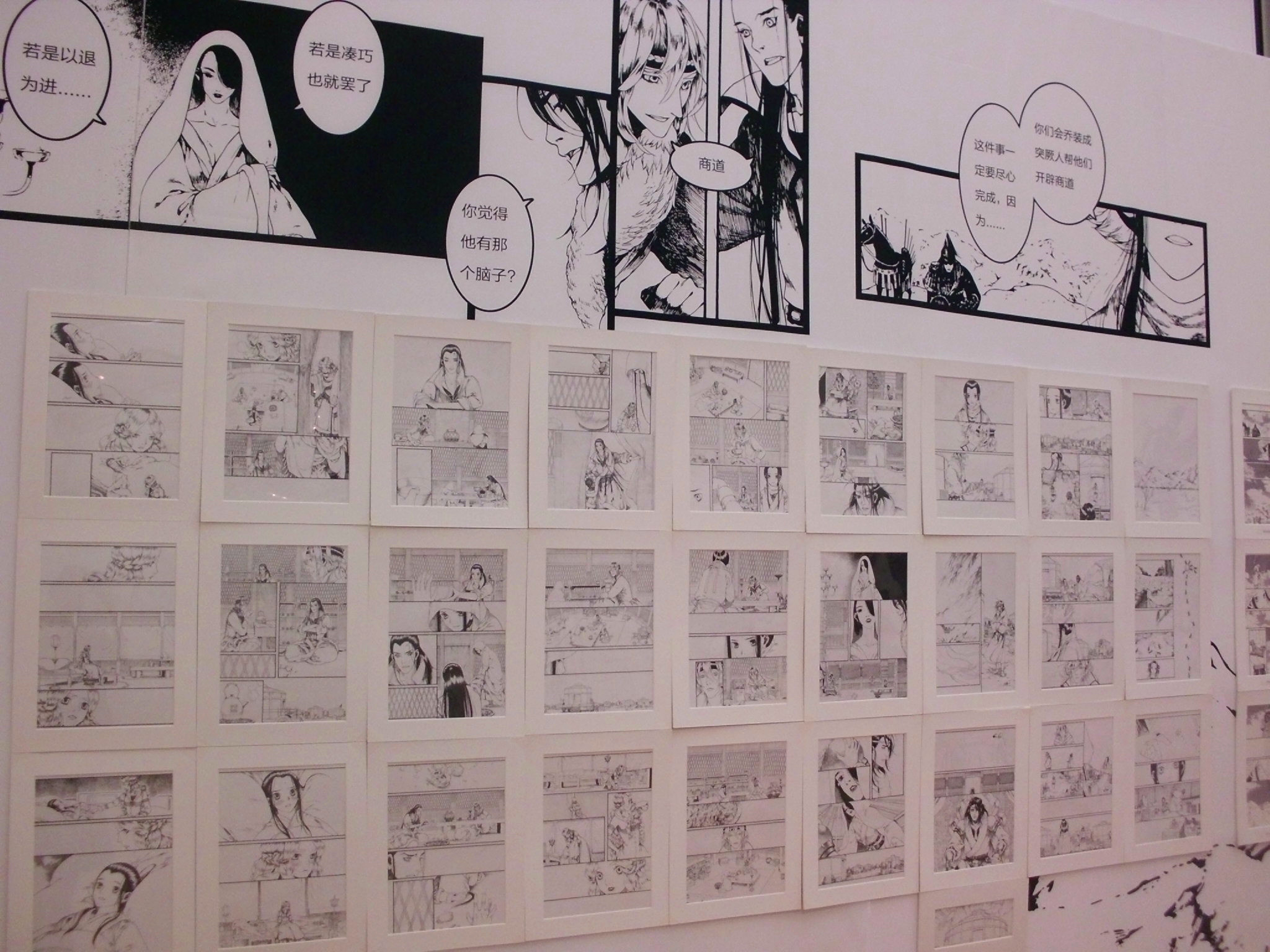
Panels of Chang Ge Xing shown in the Hangzhou Library

Her first comic book, April Story, was published in 2003 shortly before her college graduation. Zi Bu Yu, her second work, was serialized in 2008. The series won the 5th Golden Dragon Award that year, and was subsequently published in Japan by Ultra Jump in 2009. Prior to its publication in Japan, the work was reviewed and recommended by Matsui Sakamoto, editor-in-chief of the manga Saint Seiya.

After the release of Zi Bu Yu, Xia Da published several other comics. Chang Ge Xing, a historical drama set in the Tang dynasty, received the Golden Monkey Award for Chinese Comics during its serialization, and a televised series based on the comic began shooting in 2019.

In December 2016, Xia Da issued an article on Weibo holding Summer Island Studio responsible for an unequal contract agreement set to last for 10 years. A publication hiatus for Chang Ge Xing was announced in the same article, with Xia Da citing issues with her health as the main cause. On 26 December, Xia Da and more than 30 comic creators announced their contract withdrawal from Summer Island.

In September 2017, Xia Da announced the formation of her own studio in Hangzhou, along with the serialization of a new comic, Shiyi Liu.

== Awards ==
Xia Da has won many awards including:

- Golden Dragon Award for Best Girls' comic
- Newcomer Award at the first Sino-Japanese Youth Exchange Cartoon Festival

== Bibliography ==
- Winter Fairy Tale (2002)
- Da, Xia (Chinese: 夏达) (2004). 四月物语/: 夏达优秀漫画短篇集 [April Story] (in Chinese). 电子工业出版社. ISBN 9787505398962. - Total pages: 174
- Da, Xia (Chinese: 夏达) (2008). 游园惊梦 (in Chinese). 湖南少年儿童出版社. ISBN 9787535838858. - Total pages: 85
- Peony Pavilion (2008)
- Zi Bu Yu #1–2 (2008)
- Tonglei (2009)
- Morning Star of Midland (2009)
- Da, Xia (Chinese: 夏达) (2010). 哥斯拉不说话 [Godzilla Never Speaks] (in Chinese). 新世纪出版社社. ISBN 9787540544508. - Total pages: 120
- Chuxia (paintings) (2011)
- Chang Ge Xing #1–6 (2012–2014) ISBN 9789571363233
- Shiyi Liu (2018)
