= The Prisoner of Beauty =

2025 Chinese television series

- Chinese: 折腰
- Genre: Historical; Romance
- Based on: The Prisoner of Beauty by Penglai Ke
- Written by: Nanzhen
- Directed by: Deng Ke, Gao Congkai, Wang Yiding
- Starring: Song Zuer; Liu Yuning; Xuan Lu; Liu Duanduan
- Country of origin: China
- Original language: Mandarin
- No. of seasons: 1
- No. of episodes: 36 episodes

Production
- Production locations: Hengdian World Studios; Xiangshan Global Studios
- Running time: 45 minutes per episode

Original release
- Release: 13 May – 29 May 2025

The Prisoner of Beauty (折腰) is a Chinese historical romance drama co-produced by Tencent Video and Fat Bear Production, starring Song Zuer, Liu Yuning, Xuan Lu and Liu Duanduan. The plot is adapted from the romance web novel of the same name by Penglai Ke, a writer of Jinjiang City. It tells the story of Xiao Qiao and Wei Shao, the lord of the Wei family, in the midst of family and country wars. The background to the love story is a fictionalised account of building the earliest parts of the Grand Canal. (The canals were to provide supply and transport routes, to prevent flooding, and to provide water for irrigation.) Thus the series is roughly set amidst the conflicts of China's Spring and Autumn period or the Warring States period.

The drama premiered on Tencent Video on May 13, 2025.

The drama was later also added to Netflix.

== Cast ==
Actor	Role	Synopsis
Song Zuer	Xiao Qiao	Her given name was Manman, the granddaughter of the head of the Yan family. Exceptionally intelligent and extraordinary, she was renowned for her beauty, described as "eight out of ten beauties of the Yang River." For the sake of her family's safety, she volunteered to marry Wei Shao in place of Da Qiao. She possessed considerable political acumen and always considered the well-being of the people. During their time together, she gradually fell in love with Wei Shao and hoped to become part of his family. She gave birth to a daughter, Feifei.
Liu Yuning	Wei Shao	His courtesy name is Zhonglin, the head of the Wei family. He is decisive and ruthless on the battlefield, yet he also cares deeply for his people. He harbors hatred for the Qiao family because of the deaths of his father and brother, but unexpectedly marries Xiao Qiao. Initially wary of Xiao Qiao, he gradually falls in love with her through their interactions. He survived the Battle of Xindu by being locked in a wooden box by Wei Bao, but he witnessed his father and brother's murder. Since then, he has been afraid of the dark and suffers from nightmares. He is stubborn but soft-hearted, somewhat rigid and straightforward, not good at expressing himself, and prone to tantrums.
Xuan Lu	Su Ehuang	Born into the Su family of Wushan Kingdom, she was neglected as a daughter. She possessed a peony-shaped mark on her forehead, a symbol of her destiny, which was said to grant her the owner of the world (though this was false). In her youth, she lived in Wei Kingdom and shared a childhood bond with the Wei brothers. She was betrothed to Wei Bao, but after Wei Bao's death in the Battle of Xindu, she was married off to Chen Xiang, the head of the Su family, in a border state. She was known as "Lady Yulou." Extremely ambitious, she deeply hated the Qiao family and plotted to destroy the Qiao-Wei alliance. She repeatedly framed Xiao Qiao but failed. Later, rumors exposed her past misdeeds, leading to Wei Shao disfiguring her and which made her wear a mask. She then sought revenge against Wei Kingdom, allying with Liu Yan and pushing him to attack Yan State and Wei Kingdom, ultimately causing Liu Yan's death. She was born with a curse that would bring misfortune to her husbands; Wei Bao, Chen Xiang, and Liu Yan all met tragic ends because they fell in love with her. After learning that Liu Yan knew she was disfigured but still loved her, she committed suicide.
Liu Duanduan	Wei Yan	His courtesy name was Shiyuan, Wei Shao's cousin. He was born from the forced marriage of Qingyun, the only daughter of Lady Xu, and Chen Pang. He grew up with Wei Shao in the State of Wei. During his travels, he met Chen Pang's subordinates and learned his true parentage. He was also deceived into believing that his parents were in love. He resented Lady Xu for not telling him the truth and for not allowing him to hold power. Later, he was enlightened by Xiao Qiao and learned the truth, vowing to serve only the Wei family from then on. He initially harbored hostility towards the Qiao family, but was gradually moved by Xiao Qiao. Although he enjoyed lingering among women, he admired Xiao Qiao. When Su Ehuang attacked Yu County, he returned from the border state to assist in the defence.

== Production ==
- The production team officially started filming at Hengdian World Studios on January 31, 2023, and the cast was also officially announced on the same day.
- The crew finished filming at Xiangshan Film and Television City in May 2023.

== Awards ==
This TV series won 12 awards, for the lead actors, the screenwriter, and the editing.
