= The Long Ballad =

2021 Chinese historical series

- Promotional poster
- Traditional Chinese: 長歌行
- Simplified Chinese: 长歌行
- Hanyu Pinyin: Chánggē Xíng
- Genre: Historical fiction; Romance; Wuxia
- Based on: The Way of Changge (长歌行) by Xia Da (夏达)
- Written by: Pei Yufei; Chang Jiang
- Directed by: Zhu Ruibin
- Starring: Dilraba Dilmurat; Wu Lei; Zhao Lusi; Liu Yuning
- Country of origin: China
- Original language: Mandarin
- No. of seasons: 1
- No. of episodes: 49

Production
- Producer: Yan Bei
- Production location: Hengdian World Studios
- Running time: 45 minutes

Original release
- Network: Tencent Video

The Long Ballad (Chinese: 长歌行; pinyin: Chánggē Xíng) is a 2021 Chinese television series based on the manhua of the same name by Xia Da. It is directed by Zhu Ruibin, and stars Dilraba Dilmurat, Wu Lei, Zhao Lusi and Liu Yuning. Set against the backdrop of the Tang dynasty, during the reigns of Emperor Gaozu and Emperor Taizong, it tells the story of an imperial princess who seeks revenge for her family, and in doing so, her fate intertwines with that of a tribal prince. Although the series features many real historical figures, most of the relationships between the characters and plotlines are fictional.

== Plot ==
The story starts in Chang'an in the year 626 and revolves around Li Changge, one of the daughters of Li Jiancheng.

Her peaceful life turns upside down after her family is brutally massacred during the Xuanwu Gate Incident, a coup d'état instigated by her uncle Li Shimin, who later becomes Emperor Taizong. Traumatized by the sudden loss of her mother and the betrayal of her uncle, Li Changge's anguish evolves into a burning intent for vengeance.

With her mind firmly fixed on revenge, she sets off on a journey to overthrow Li Shimin. Along the way, she unexpectedly meets Ashile Sun, who is later revealed to be a valiant general of the Eastern Turkic Khaganate and Tegin of the Eagle Division. Through countless events, their fates become increasingly intertwined, and together they soon discover the forces working behind the scenes that could jeopardise the safety and peace of everything they love.

== Cast ==
=== Main ===
- Dilraba Dilmurat as Li Changge, Commandery Princess Yongning
  - Historical prototype: County Princess Dingxiang (定襄县主)

Li Jiancheng's daughter. Proficient in martial arts and military strategy, she seeks to avenge her mother who was killed by her second uncle, Li Shimin.

- Leo Wu as Ashile Sun, Tegin of the Eagle Division
  - Historical prototype: Ashina Zhong (阿史那忠)

Yanli Qaghan's adopted son. A skilled warrior and strategist who is embroiled in rivalry for the throne.

- Liu Yuning as Hao Du
  - Historical prototype: Du He (杜荷)

Du Ruhui's foster son. Cold-blooded and loyal, he works for Li Shimin.

- Zhao Lusi as Li Leyan, Princess Yongan
  - Historical prototype: Princess Chengyang (城阳公主)

Li Shimin's daughter. A shy but independent princess. She is Li Changge's closest friend.

- Fang Yilun as Wei Shuyu

Wei Zheng's son. A Tang official who grew up with Li Changge and Li Leyan.

=== Supporting ===
==== Tang ====
- Geng Le as Li Shimin, Emperor Taizong

Li Changge's beloved second uncle who betrayed her trust.

- He Yuxiao as Li Chengqian, Crown Prince of Tang

Li Shimin's troublemaking eldest son.

- Liu Jinlong as Li Jiancheng

Li Changge's father and elder brother of Li Shimin.

- Xu Rongzhen as Lady Jin

Li Changge's mother.

- Cheng Taishen as Du Ruhui

Hao Du's foster father. A Tang official and Li Shimin's loyal supporter.

- Tan Jianchang as Wei Zheng

Wei Shuyu's father. Li Jiancheng's advisor who later becomes Li Shimin's official.

- Nicholas Wang as General Wang Junkuo
- Yang Zi Hua as Fang Xuanling

Li Changge's teacher and later chancellor of Tang under Li Shimin.

- Tian Yupeng as Li Jing
- Mei Lingzhen as Hongfu

Li Jing's wife.

- Kong Qili as Li Chunfeng
- Dongli Wuyou as Sheng Xin

Li Chengqian's servant.

==== Ashile ====
- Jin Song as Ashile Chuobi, Yanli Qaghan
  - Historical prototype: Illig Qaghan (颉利可汗)

Ashile Sun's adoptive father and ruler of the Ashile Tribe. Uncle and stepfather of Ashile She'er.

- Yang Mingna as Princess Yicheng, Khatun of Ashile Tribe

A princess from the Sui dynasty. Mother of Ashile She'er and Yanli Qaghan's wife.

- Kudousi Jiang Ainiwaer as Ashile She'er, Young Khan of Ashile Tribe

Princess Yicheng's only child, and nephew and stepson of Yanli Qaghan. Ashile Sun's biggest rival and leader of the Wolf Division.

- Lu Yanbei as Lady Jinse

Yanli Qaghan's concubine and granddaughter of a Sui dynasty duke.

- Zhu Liqun as A'Yi'er

Ashile Sun's foster mother.

- Yi Daqian as Mu Jin

Ashile Sun's childhood friend and trusted general.

- Jiang Xiaolin as Su Yishe

Ashile Sun's trusted general.

- Zhang Haozhe as Yaluo

Ashile Sun's trusted general.

- Cao Xiyue as Mimi Guli

Li Changge's close friend and childhood playmate of Ashile She'er.

==== People around Li Changge ====
- Feng Junjie as A'Dou

Li Changge's apprentice.

- Lu Xingyu as Gongsun Heng

Governor of Shuozhou.

- Wang Jingyan as Madame Gongsun

Gongsun Heng's wife.

- Li Jianyi as Qin Lao

Gongsun Heng's butler.

- Wu Chengxu as Xu Feng

Gongsun Heng's bodyguard.

- Liu Chuxuan as Luo Shiba

General Luo's last warrior who later serves Li Changge.

- Liu Haikuan as Situ Langlang

Li Changge's martial arts teacher.

- Li Guangfu as Sun Simiao

A Taoist physician renowned for his medical knowledge and skills.

- Sa Dingding as Lady Jingdan

Leader of Luiyin Taoist Monastery in Luoyang.

==== Others ====
- Zhou Aoyun as Buzhen

Mimi Guli's younger brother and the companion of the King of Sui.

== Production ==
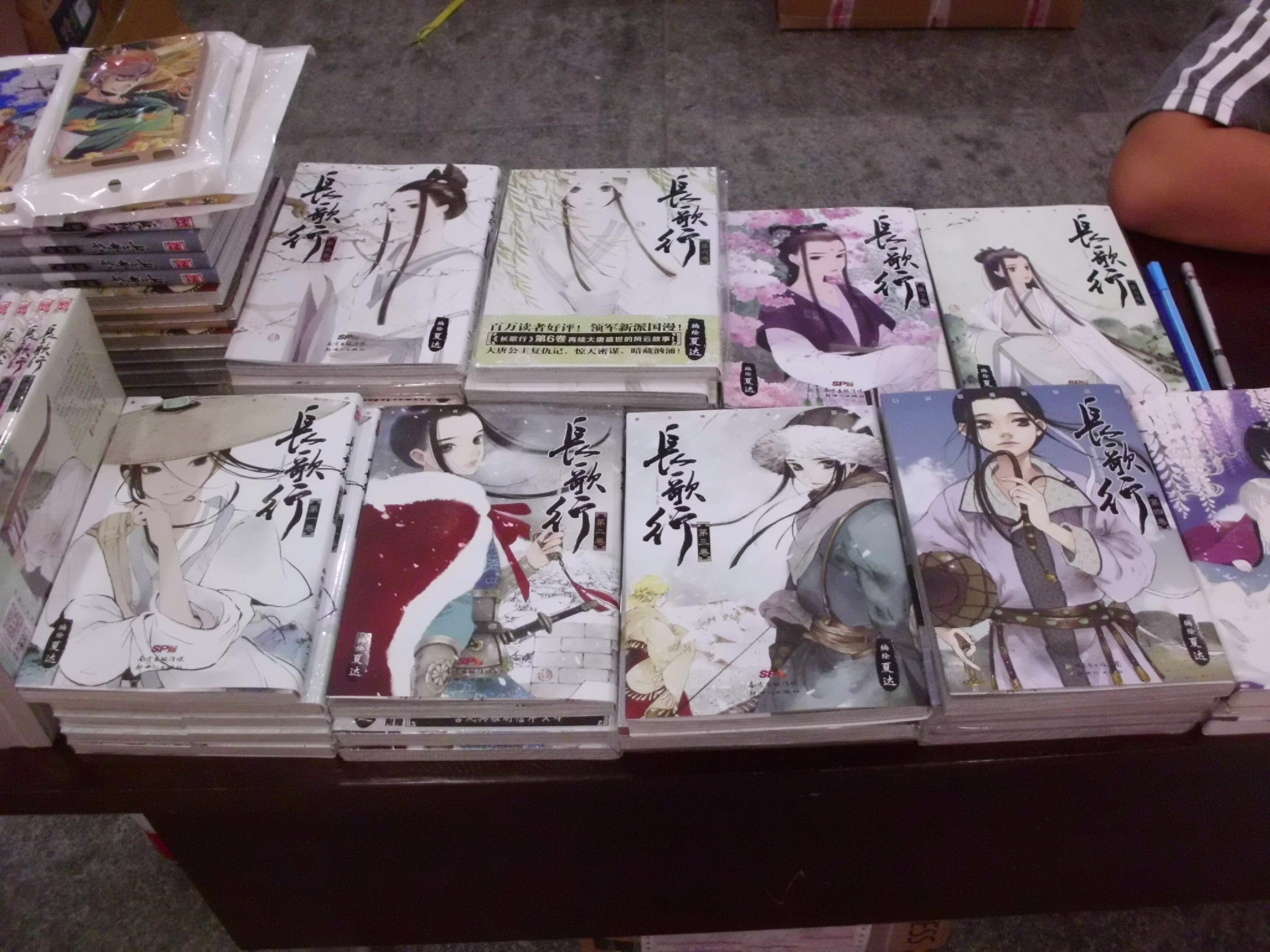
Editions of the manhua Chang Ge Xing

The Long Ballad is based on Xia Da's manhua Chang Ge Xing, which was published from 2011 to 2016. The manhua has received numerous awards such as the Golden Dragon Award for Best Girls' Comic and the Newcomer Award at the first Sino-Japanese Youth Exchange Cartoon Festival.

== Original soundtrack ==
The Long Ballard Original Soundtrack (长歌行视原声音乐专辑)
No.	Title	Lyrics	Music	Singers	Length
1.	"Cocoon (茧)" (Ending theme song)	Sa Ji	Jin Dachuan	Zhou Shen	3:25
2.	"The Direction of Light (光的方向)" (Opening theme song)	Sa Ji	Jin Dachuan	Zhang Bichen	3:04
3.	"If You Come Back (如若归来)"	Sa Ji; Kun Mingli	Sa Ji	Sa Dingding	3:21
4.	"Falling Sand (落砂)"	Sa Ji	Jin Dachuan	Jin Wenqi	3:24
5.	"I Wish You Were My Long Lasting (多麼願你是我恆久的歌)"	Sa Ji	Jin Dachuan	Zhao Lusi	3:34
6.	"A Love Like Before (一愛如故)"	Zhang Chang	Jin Dachuan	Liu Yuning	3:55

== Awards and nominations ==
Award	Category	Nomination	Result	Ref.
16th Seoul International Drama Awards	Asian Star Award	Dilraba Dilmurat	Won	

== International broadcast ==
It is available for streaming on Netflix, YouTube and Viu.

In India this series aired on MX player in Hindi, Tamil, and Telugu dub version from 2021.

== Reception ==
The Long Ballad was well received both at home and overseas. According to the overseas distributors of the series, the first 20 episodes of the English and Vietnamese versions accumulated over 20 million views online as of April 6, 2021, just a little over three weeks after it began airing.
