= Klara Elias =

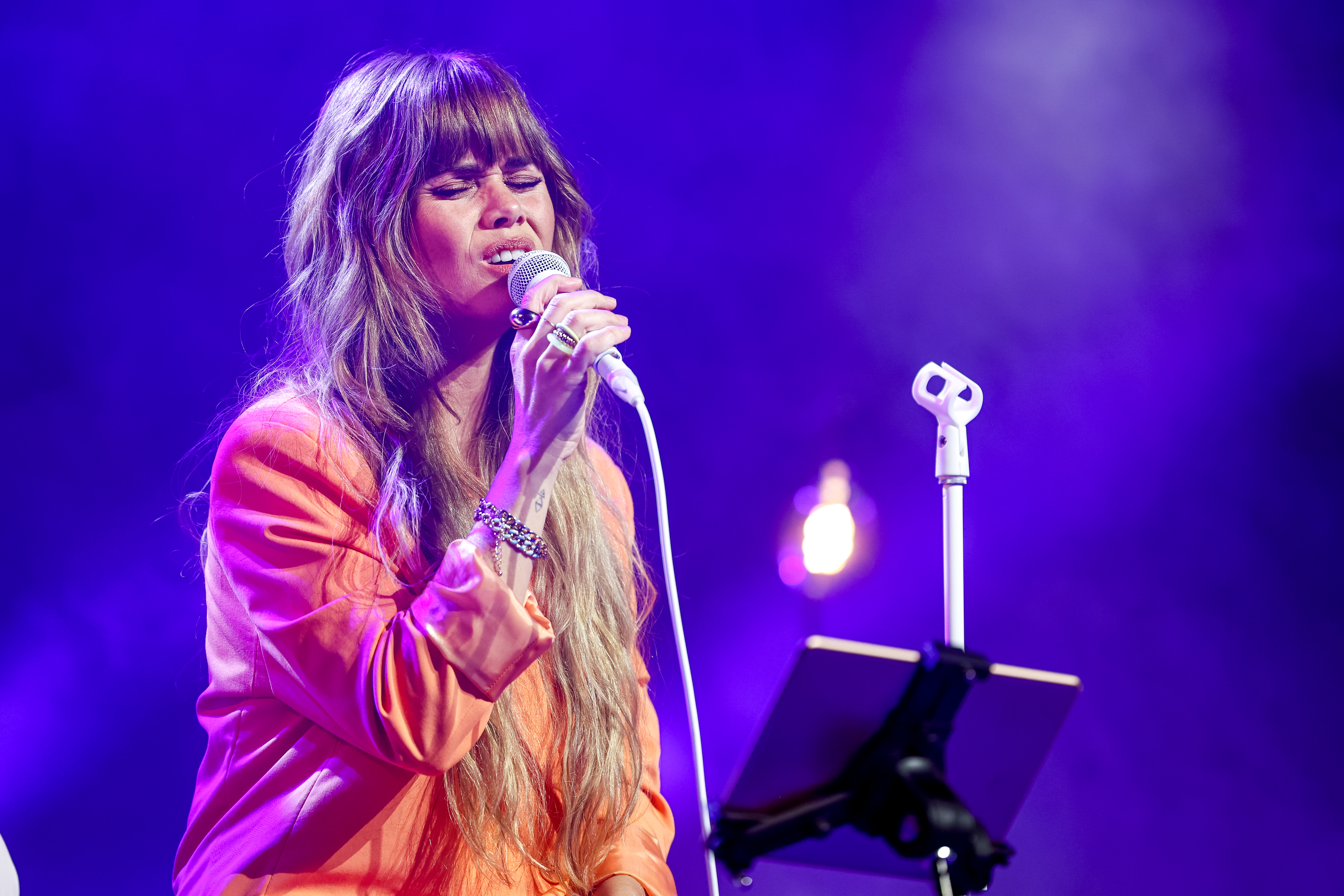
- Klara Elias performing in November 2023
- Born: Klara Ósk Elíasdóttir; 27 November 1985 (age 39); Stockholm, Sweden
- Other names: Klara Elias
- Occupations: Singer; songwriter
- Years active: 1997–present
- Musical career
- Genres: Pop; folk music; indie pop
- Instruments: Vocals; piano
- Website: klaraelias.com

Klara Elias (born November 27, 1985), full name Klara Ósk Elíasdóttir, is an Icelandic singer and songwriter best known for being the lead singer of Iceland's most successful girl group Nylon as well as for her success in Iceland as a solo artist and songwriter. Her single Eyjanótt ranked first on the Icelandic national chart for the last week of June 2022.

== Early life ==
Klara Elias was raised in Hafnarfjörður, Iceland. She finished her elementary education in Hvaleyrarskóli and then went on to Verzlunarskóli Íslands (e. The Commercial Collage of Iceland).

== Career ==
=== Nylon: 2004-2007 ===
When Klara was 11 years old she was cast as one of the leads in the musical Bugsy Malone, directed by Baltasar Kormákur. Her big break came when she was 18 years old and she auditioned for a girl group being put together in Iceland. Auditions were held at Hotel Nordica in March 2004. She was selected along with two other girls, Alma Guðmundsdóttir and Steinunn Þóra Camilla Sigurðardóttir to form the group. The band was named Nylon and during the process of recording the first single for the band a fourth member, Emilía Björg Óskarsdóttir, was added to the group. The band debuted on the 7th of April 2004 and went on to become hugely popular. With 10 number one singles, 3 number one albums, a book and a tv show about the band they went on to become Iceland's most successful girl group to date. In late 2005 the band signed a major label deal with Universal in the UK and the band toured as an opening act with bands such as Westlife, Girls Aloud and McFly opening their arena tours the following year, performing on Wembley arena 7 times in one year.

=== The Charlies: 2007-2015 ===
In 2007, Emilía, decided to leave the group. The other original band members went on to change their band name to The Charlies and signed a major label record deal in 2009 with Hollywood Records in Hollywood, California. Following the signing the three of them were encouraged to take up artist names and Klara started using Klara Elias. The band moved to Los Angeles in the spring of 2010 to start work on their album. They worked on the album with artists and writers such as Bruno Mars, The Smeezingtons, The Movement, Zeke Lewis, J.R Rotem to name a few. The group left the label in 2012 and went on to release independently an EP titled “Start A Fire” in November 2012. The EP was produced by the Icelandic production team StopWaitGo.

=== Songwriting and solo career: 2015-present ===
In 2014 all members of The Charlies started focusing on solo projects and other individual endeavours and officially announced their split in January 2015. All three work together in different capacities and maintain close friendships.

In 2015 Klara briefly worked on a solo project before completely turning her focus on to songwriting for other artists. In the end of 2020, during The Covid-19 pandemic Klara went to Iceland to be closer to family and while in Iceland launched a solo project under her artist name, Klara Elias and permanently moved back to Iceland in the beginning of 2021. She has since become one of Icelands most celebrated singers and songwriters. Her success with her song Eyjanótt in 2022 really put her back on the map in Iceland's music scene, this time as a solo artist. She has been nominated as singer of the year at the Icelandic Listeners Awards six times having won the award once and also getting nominations in other categories such as song of the year, songwriter of the year and music video of the year.

=== Nylon reunion: 2023 ===
In August 2024 Klara organised a surprise 20 year reunion of Nylon as the original line up joined her on stage for her performance at Tónaflóð á Menningarnótt downtown Reykjavík. The band released the song Einu sinni enn that same night and fans were posting videos of them crying from joy over the reunion.

== Personal life ==
Klara became a vegan in 2017 for environmental reasons but has said that since then her choice to remain vegan has evolved into first and foremost being for the ethical reasons behind veganism and ending animal abuse. She is vocal on her social media accounts speaking out about various social issues such as animal rights, trans rights and peoples right to abortions and health care.

She has been in a relationship with Jeremy Aclipen, a Brazilian jiu-jitsu trainer and children’s counsellor, since March 2021. They became engaged in November 2023.

== Awards and nominations ==
Year	Organization	Award	Work	Result	Ref.
2006	Hlustendaverðlaunin (The Audience Awards)	Söngkona ársins (Singer Of The Year)	Klara Elias	Won	
2006	Hlustendaverðlaunin (The Audience Awards)	Tónlistarmyndband ársins (Music Video Of the Year)	Nylon (Closer)	Won	
2006	Icelandic Children's Book Awards	Barnabók ársins (Children's book of the Year)	Nylon (Closer)	Won	
2007	Hlustendaverðlaunin (The Audience Awards)	Söngkona ársins (Singer Of The Year)	Klara Elias	Nominated	
2007	Hlustendaverðlaunin (The Audience Awards)	Hljómsveit ársins (Band of the Year)	Nylon	Nominated	
2021	Hlustendaverðlaunin (The Audience Awards)	Söngkona ársins (Singer Of The Year)	Klara Elias	Nominated	
2022	Hlustendaverðlaunin (The Audience Awards)	Söngkona ársins (Singer Of The Year)	Klara Elias	Nominated	
2023	Hlustendaverðlaunin (The Audience Awards)	Söngkona ársins (Singer Of The Year)	Klara Elias	Nominated	
2023	Hlustendaverðlaunin (The Audience Awards)	Lag ársins (Eyjanótt)	Klara Elias	Nominated	
2023	Hlustendaverðlaunin (The Audience Awards)	Lagahöfundur ársins (Songwriter of the Year)	Klara Elias	Nominated	
2024	Hlustendaverðlaunin (The Audience Awards)	Söngkona ársins (Singer Of The Year)	Klara Elias	Nominated	
2024	Hlustendaverðlaunin (The Audience Awards)	Tónlistarmyndband ársins (Music Video Of the Year)	Nylon (Einu Sinni Enn)	Nominated	
