= City Lights (EP) =

- Digital cover

EP by Baekhyun
- Released: July 10, 2019
- Recorded: 2019
- Studios: SM Studios, Seoul, South Korea
- Genres: R&B; Hip hop; Electropop
- Length: 21:37
- Language: Korean
- Labels: SM; Dreamus
- Producers: Lee Soo-man; Dress; Cha Cha Malone; The Stereotypes; LDN Noise; Darkchild; Zayson

Baekhyun chronology
City Lights (2019)	Delight (2020)

Singles from City Lights
- 1. "UN Village" Released: July 10, 2019

Professional ratings
Review scores
Source	Rating
IZM	3/5 stars
Rolling Stone India	4/5 stars
SCMP	5/5 stars

City Lights is the debut extended play by South Korean singer Baekhyun. It was released on July 10, 2019 by SM Entertainment. The album features six tracks, including the lead single "UN Village".

== Background and release ==
On June 10, 2019, it was announced that Baekhyun will debut as a solo artist in July. At midnight on June 20, the album's title and release date were announced. SM Entertainment began releasing teasers on July 2 through Exo's official social media accounts. Additionally, Baekhyun posted a teaser for his debut through a vlog on his official YouTube channel.

The album and its title track's music video were released on July 10 at 6PM KST both digitally and physically. On July 12, a live session video of "UN Village" was released. A third version of the album was released on July 19.

== Composition and production ==
City Lights has six songs which feature R&B, hip hip hop and pop genres. The album's title track "UN Village" is a romantic R&B love song that combines groovy beats and string sound with sensational lyrics about a romantic moment a couple share under the moonlight of UN Village hill.

Various world-renowned music producer Darkchild, The Stereotypes, Cha Cha Malone, LDN Noise have participated in the album. Korean rapper Beenzino was featured in the side track "Stay Up!", a dreamy R&B song with lyrics that draw attention by mentioning special nights with his loved one in sexy narrative.

The third track "Betcha" is a hip hop R&B with urban beats song with lyrics that tells a story about a cute yet confident attitude of a man who is confident that the other person is destined for love. "Ice Queen" is characterized as an R&B song with a sophisticated beat and a catchy melody with lyrics about winning the girls' cold heart with his warm one. "Diamond" is described as an R&B ballad with impressive major and minor melodies with the lyrics that compare love for lovers to a solidly glowing diamond. The last song "Psycho" is an electronic pop that expresses the inner selves of a man lost among confused emotions.

== Promotion ==
Before the music video and album's release, Baekhyun held a private showcase in Seoul Arts Center where he performed the lead single "UN Village" for the first time for the media. Two hours after the release, he appeared on a live broadcast through the Naver app V Live where he talked about the process of the album and performed "UN Village", "Betcha" and "Ice Queen". On July 11, Baekhyun uploaded a vlog titled "UN Village behind clip" through his YouTube channel where he revealed parts of the filming process for his music video.

On July 12, Baekhyun performed "UN Village" on You Hee-yeol's Sketchbook. On the same day, he also started performing "UN Village" on South Korean music programs from July 12 on Music Bank. The song has since achieved a total of three trophies.

== Reception ==
City Lights received generally positive reviews from critics. Tamar Hermann of Billboard opined that Baekhyun's "expressive vocals relay a wide array of emotions". She added that by frequently layering different recordings atop of one another, "the wide range of Baekhyun's tone and artistic style" was revealed. Riddhi Chakraborty of Rolling Stone India stated that "Baekhyun's penchant for romantic ballads is forgotten as he makes a complete immersion into dark and heady R&B". She concluded that by releasing City Lights, Baekhyun "has proven that he understands exactly what kind of artist he is and what he's capable of, therefore he's unafraid to be seen in a brand new light".

== Commercial performance ==
On July 9, it was reported that the pre-order sales of City Lights reached 401,545 copies in eight days. Shortly after its release, the EP topped over 67 countries' iTunes charts. City Lights went on to debut atop the Gaon Album Chart for the week ending on July 13, becoming his first chart-topper. The EP became the top-selling album of July 2019 on Gaon's Album Chart with a total of 508,321 sales. It eventually sold over 576,029 copies, which made it the best-selling solo album in South Korea since Hestory (2003) by Kim Gun-mo, until it was surpassed by Baekhyun's second EP Delight the following year.

The EP also attained international success by debuting at number four on the Billboard World Albums Chart, becoming his first top-five entry on the chart. City Lights sold 1,000 copies in the United States according to Nielsen Music, despite less than two full days of sales for the Billboard week's charts. In France, City Lights peaked at number 20 on the French Digital Albums Chart. The EP also debuted at 8 on the Billboard Japan Hot Albums Chart and number 31 on the Australian Digital Album Chart, making it his first album to chart in both countries.

== Track listing ==
City Lights track listing
No.	Title	Lyrics	Music	Arrangement	Length
1.	"UN Village"	LIØN	LIØN; Dress	Dress	3:55
2.	"Stay Up" (featuring Beenzino)	JQ (Makeumine Works); Park Ji-hee (Makeumine Works); Beenzino	Cha Cha Malone (Iconic Sounds); Adrian McKinnon; Michelle Cho (Singing Beetle); Zachary Chicoine; Beenzino	Cha Cha Malone (Iconic Sounds)	3:27
3.	"Betcha"	Kenzie	Kenzie; The Stereotypes; August Rigo	The Stereotypes	3:21
4.	"Ice Queen"	Baylee (Stoneship)	Greg Bonnick; Hayden Chapman; Bobii Lewis; Adrian McKinnon	LDN Noise	3:35
5.	"Diamond"	Colde	Rodney "Darkchild" Jerkins; Marlin "Hookman" Bonds; Deez	Rodney "Darkchild" Jerkins	3:57
6.	"Psycho" (bonus track)	Seo Ji-eum	Zayson; Megan Lee	Zayson	3:25
Total length:					21:41

== Charts ==
=== Weekly charts ===
Weekly chart performance for City Lights
Chart (2019)	Peak position
Australian Digital Albums (ARIA)	18
French Digital Albums (SNEP)	20
Japanese Albums (Oricon)	14
Japanese Hot Albums (Billboard Japan)	8
Lithuanian Albums (AGATA)	93
Polish Albums (ZPAV)	15
South Korean Albums (Gaon)	1
UK Album Downloads (Official Charts)	52
US Digital Albums (Billboard)	21
US Heatseekers Albums (Billboard)	4
US Independent Albums (Billboard)	9
US World Albums (Billboard)	4

=== Year-end charts ===
Chart performance for City Lights
Chart (2019)	Position
South Korean Albums (Gaon)	6

== Sales ==
Sales figures for City Lights
Region	Sales
South Korea	580,326
Japan	8,000
United States	4,000

== Certifications ==
Certifications for City Lights
Region	Certification	Certified units/sales
South Korea (KMCA)	2× Platinum	500,000^{^}
^{^} Shipments figures based on certification alone.

== Accolades ==
Year-end lists
Critic/Publication	List	Rank	Ref.
Billboard	The 25 Best K-Pop Albums of 2019	12	
Reddit K-Pop	Best Album Cover Art 2019	5	
Idology Korea	2019: Album Of The Year	19	

Awards and nominations
Year	Organization	Award	Nominated work	Result	Ref
2020	Golden Disc Awards	Disc Bonsang	City Lights	Won	
2020	Golden Disc Awards	Disc Daesang	City Lights	Nominated	
2020	Gaon Chart Music Awards	Album of the Year - 3rd Quarter	City Lights	Nominated	
2020	Mnet Asian Music Award	Best Male Artist	"UN Village"	Won	

== Release history ==
Release history for City Lights
Region	Date	Format	Label
South Korea	July 10, 2019	CD	SM; Dreamus
Various	July 10, 2019	Digital download; streaming	SM

== See also ==
- List of certified albums in South Korea
- List of K-pop songs on the Billboard charts
- List of K-pop albums on the Billboard charts
- List of Gaon Album Chart number ones of 2019
