= YY.com =

Chinese video-based social network

YY
- Website type: Online chat, streaming media
- Available in: Chinese, Vietnamese
- Traded as: Nasdaq: YY
- Owner: JOYY
- Website: yy.com
- Registration: Optional
- Launched: 2012; 14 years ago
- Current status: Active

YY is a major Chinese video-based social network, a subsidiary of JOYY. It features a virtual currency which users earn through activities such as karaoke or creating tutorial videos and which is later converted to real cash. It started as an online gaming and esports platform but transitioned to broader use for livestreaming. Users exchange "virtual roses" as a form of currency, with top users said to earn as much as $20,000 per month. In November 2012, YY was listed on the NASDAQ.

The website was originally known as YY Voice (Chinese: 语音). On 24 November 2014, YY's video streaming service began operating independently as Huya Live.

On 18 November 2020, MuddyWatersResearch released a report claiming fraud in the financial and public reporting of JOYY Inc. leading to a significant decrease in the value of its shares.

In 2025, Baidu Inc. acquired the YY Live streaming platform from Joyy Inc., for about $2.1 billion.
