= Nylon (band) =

Icelandic girl group

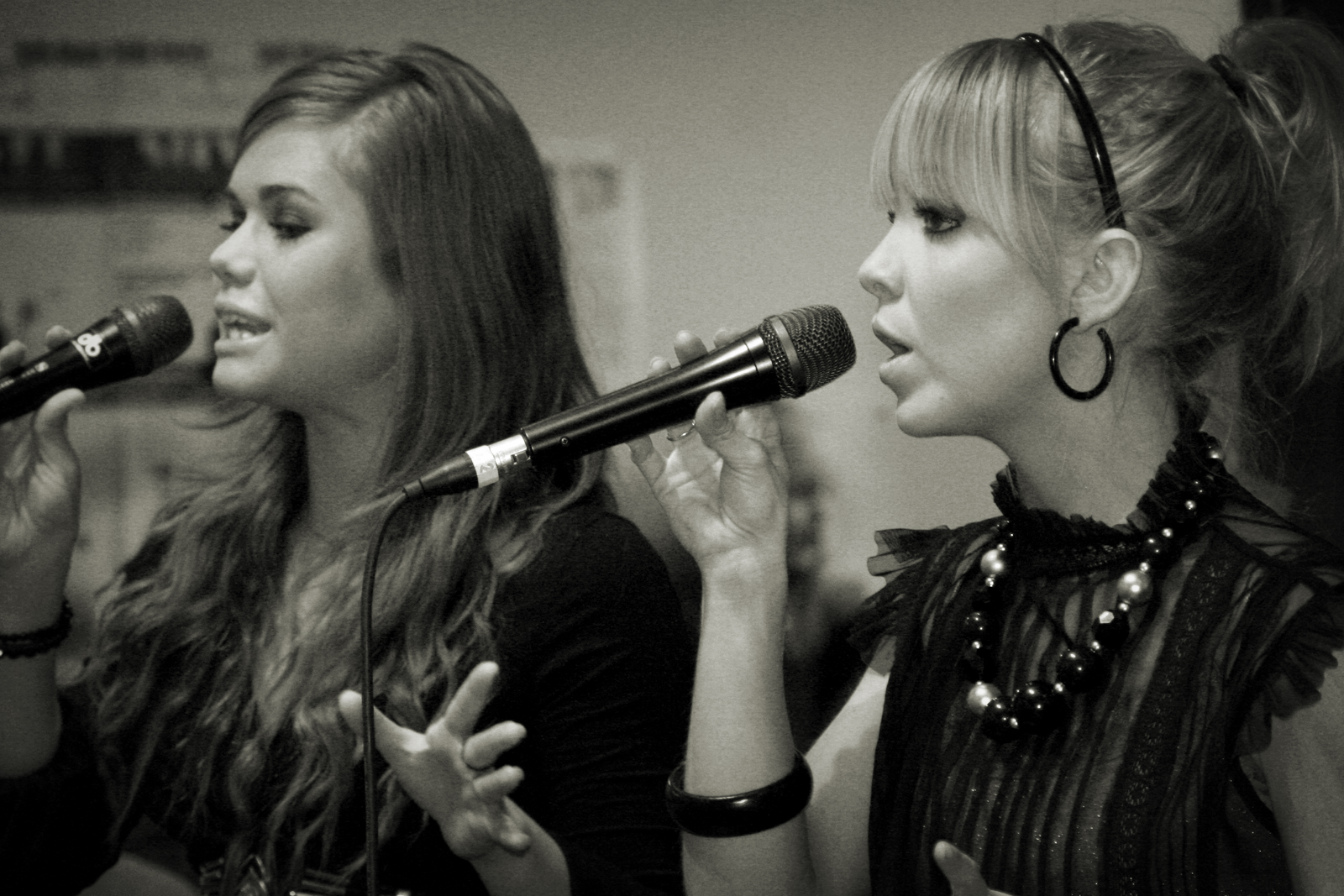
- Nylon in 2006

Background information
- Origin: Iceland
- Genres: Pop
- Years active: 2004–2008, 2023-present
- Label: Believer Music/Universal Music
- Past members: Klara Elias; Alma Goodman; Camilla Stones; Emilía Óskarsdóttir

Nylon is an Icelandic girl group composed of members Alma Goodman (born Alma Guðmundsdóttir), Camilla Stones (born Steinunn Þóra Camilla Sigurðardóttir) and Klara Elias (born Klara Ósk Elíasdóttir). They are Iceland's most successful singer/songwriter girl-band, producing ten number one singles, three number one studio albums, one number one compilation and one number one DVD in Iceland.

== History ==
=== 2004–2005: 100% Nylon and Góðir Hlutir ===
The group was formed after auditions in Iceland, which Alma, Camilla and Klara attended. A few weeks after the auditions, Emilia was asked whether she would like to be in the band, and after meeting them, she accepted the offer. The group sings pop music in English and Icelandic. Their first single, "Lög Unga Fólksins" (which means "Songs of the Youth" in English), was released in April 2004 and went straight to number one. The group have had huge success in their native country of Iceland: achieving a total of 13 Number 1 singles to date, a TV show about their first summer as a girlband, three chart topping albums, and a book entitled 100% Nylon (which instantly became a best seller). They have also released a DVD entitled Nylon Allstaðar, which contained their smash hit TV show as well as other bonus features.

Nylon have released three albums in Iceland, the two Icelandic language albums being titled Góðir Hlutir and 100% Nylon. Both albums went straight to number one. Their third album (and first English effort) 100% Nylon, or plainly Nylon in Iceland, features many exclusively English songs as well as many re-written Icelandic tracks. Nylon have also worked with many artists in Iceland for various collaborations. They are featured on an Icelandic Christmas album titled Jólaskraut, released Christmas 2005. Another notable collaboration the band has done would be "Furðuverk", on one of the biggest selling children albums of all time, Stóra Stundin Okkar. Many of the group's singles have also been featured on various compilation albums.

=== 2006–2007: Nylon and international success ===
Nylon released their debut UK single "Losing a Friend" (written by English songwriters, Chris and Tony Griffiths, ex The Real People) on 10 July 2006. It reached number 29 in the UK Top 40 singles chart, was Woolworths' single of the week upon release, and also hit number one on The Box's famed Box Breakers chart. Nylon have supported Westlife, Girls Aloud, McFly and Journey South on all of their UK tours. On the latter, Klara had become ill and the band had to pull out last minute and return to Iceland.

The follow-up to "Losing a Friend" was a double A-Side single; "Closer", another Griffiths composition, and a cover of the Eurythmics classic "Sweet Dreams". The video for "Closer" was being rotated on The Box and, as "Losing a Friend" did, reached #1 on the Box Breakers chart. The single was released on October 23. Although it had previously made #1 in Iceland, it failed to reach the top 40 in the UK. Although, "Sweet Dreams" did receive much attention from clubs, making it #1 on the Commercial Dance Charts in the UK for an entire week. The April release of "Holiday", the band's last single with all four bandmembers, went straight to number one and was on the top of the Icelandic Chart for over a month. "Holiday" went on to be one of the girl's biggest selling singles ever.

=== 2007–2008: Emilia's departure, 100% Nylon and break ===
The UK release of 100% Nylon, originally announced for October 2006, was then planned for February 2007 but was cancelled and shelved when Emilia Bjorg, a founding member of the group, left the band in late summer of 2007. The news, announced on their official website a day after the press had reported the story, came shortly after a swarm of press over Emilia getting married. With Nylon's upcoming schedule, it is rumoured that the reason Emilia left the band was to spend time with her husband rather than traveling the world with the band. Emilia and the rest of the girls are still on fantastic terms, with Emilia still heading out to the occasional Nylon concert.

In 2007, as a trio, the group release a Best Af, album in Iceland this November 2007 featuring all of their past singles, videos, and new single "Holiday" (with Emilia yet) and "Shut Up" reaching two #1. In 2008 the group returned to Iceland and announced the disband. They said they missed family in Iceland – the group moved to UK when released their third album.

== The Charlies ==
In 2011, Klara Elias, Alma Goodman and Camilla Stones formed a spin-off new group named The Charlies. The group released only one single, "Hello Luv", but failed to sign a new contract with a label. On January 17, 2015, they disbanded.

== Discography ==
=== Studio albums ===
- 2004: 100% Nylon
- 2005: Góðir Hlutir
- 2006: Nylon

=== Compilation ===
- 2007: Best Af Nylon

=== DVD ===
- 2005: Nylon Allstaðar
