= Taeyeon singles discography =

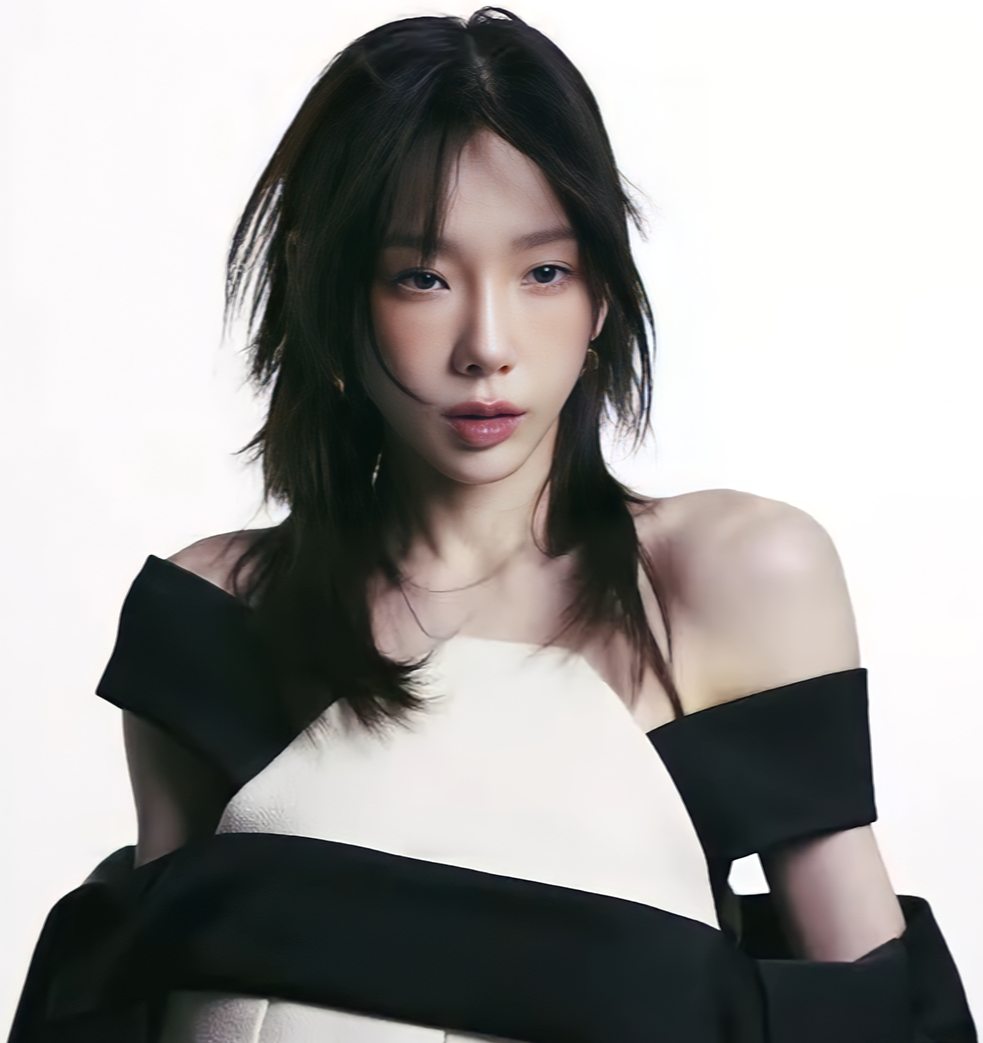
- Taeyeon in 2023
- Singles: 41
- Music videos: 32

The discography of the South Korean singer Taeyeon consists of 41 singles including eight as featured artist and 14 recorded for soundtracks. She debuted as a member of South Korean girl group Girls' Generation in August 2007, and embarked on a solo career in 2015.

During her career beginnings, Taeyeon established herself as one of the most renowned vocalists in South Korea with soundtrack recordings for Korean dramas, notably "If" for Hong Gil Dong (2008) and "Can You Hear Me" for Beethoven Virus (2008); the latter helped Taeyeon win the Popularity Award at the 2008 Golden Disk Awards. Referred to as the "OST Queen", she further recorded popular soundtrack hits including "I Love You" for Athena: Goddess of War (2010), "Missing You like Crazy" for The King 2 Hearts (2012), "Closer" for To the Beautiful You (2012), and "And One" for That Winter, the Wind Blows (2013).

Her debut extended play I (2015) peaked at number two on South Korea's Gaon Album Chart and has sold over 160,000 physical copies. The title track peaked atop the Gaon Digital Chart and has sold over 2.5 million digital units. In February 2016, Taeyeon released "Rain" as the opening single for digital music project SM Station. The single reached number one in South Korea and has sold over 2.5 million copies. Her second EP Why (2016), reached number one in South Korea and spawned two Gaon top-ten singles–"Starlight" and "Why". Taeyeon's first studio album, My Voice (2017), peaked atop the Gaon Album Chart and has sold over 230,000 copies in South Korea. The album features three South Korean top-five singles: the chart-topper "Fine", "11:11", and "Make Me Love You".

Taeyeon further released two South Korean top-five EPs, This Christmas: Winter Is Coming (2017) and Something New (2018), and a Japanese top-ten EP, Voice (2019). Her second studio album, Purpose (2019), debuted at number two in South Korea with first-week sales of 154,000 copies. It includes the singles "Four Seasons" and "Spark", which peaked at numbers one and two on the Gaon Digital Chart, respectively. Her other number-one singles in South Korea include "Like a Star" (with The One, 2010), "Lonely" (with Jonghyun, 2017), and "All About You" for the drama Hotel Del Luna (2019).

== As lead artist ==
=== Korean ===
List of singles as lead artist, showing year released, selected chart positions, sales figures, certifications, and name of the album
Title	Year	Peak chart positions						Sales	Certifications	Album
Title	Year	KOR	KOR Hot	SGP	VIE	US World	WW	Sales	Certifications	Album
"I" (featuring Verbal Jint)	2015	1	—	—	—	—	—	KOR: 2,500,000; US: 15,000	N/A	I
"Rain"	2016	1	—	—	—	3	—	KOR: 2,500,000	N/A	SM Station Season 1
"Starlight" (featuring Dean)	2016	5	—	—	—	6	—	KOR: 474,489	N/A	Why
"Why"	2016	7	—	—	—	6	—	KOR: 689,209	N/A	Why
"11:11"	2016	2	—	—	—	5	—	KOR: 2,500,000; US: 3,000	N/A	My Voice
"Fine"	2017	1	45	—	—	7	—	KOR: 2,500,000	N/A	My Voice
"Make Me Love You"	2017	4	58	—	—	11	—	KOR: 447,673	N/A	My Voice
"This Christmas"	2017	2	5	—	—	—	—	KOR: 227,856	N/A	This Christmas: Winter Is Coming
"Something New"	2018	15	15	—	—	24	—	N/A	N/A	Something New
"Four Seasons" (사계)	2019	1	1	—	—	6	—	KOR: 2,500,000	KMCA: Platinum (DL); KMCA: 2× Platinum (st.)	Purpose
"Spark" (불티)	2019	2	2	—	—	25	—	N/A	N/A	Purpose
"Dear Me" (내게 들려주고 싶은 말)	2020	20	16	—	—	—	—	N/A	N/A	Purpose (Repackage)
"Happy"	2020	4	6	—	—	9	—	US: 1,000	N/A	What Do I Call You
"What Do I Call You"	2020	14	15	—	—	—	—	N/A	N/A	What Do I Call You
"Weekend"	2021	4	4	7	—	7	— (Note: "Weekend" did not enter Billboard Global 200, but peaked at number 181 on the Billboard Global Excl. U.S. chart.)	N/A	KMCA: Platinum (st.)	INVU
"Can't Control Myself"	2022	8	9	— (Note: "Can't Control Myself" did not enter the RIAS Top Streaming Chart, but peaked at number 17 on the RIAS Top Regional Chart.)	27	13	—	N/A	N/A	INVU
"INVU"	2022	1	1	11	12	8	— (Note: "INVU" did not enter the Billboard Global 200, but peaked at number 138 on the Billboard Global Excl. U.S. chart.)	N/A	KMCA: Platinum (st.)	INVU
"To. X"	2023	2	3	—	93	—	— (Note: "To. X" did not enter the Billboard Global 200, but peaked at number 103 on the Billboard Global Excl. U.S. chart.)	N/A	KMCA: Platinum (st.)	To. X
"Heaven"	2024	47	—	—	—N/a	—	—	KOR: 14,450 (phy.)	N/A	Non-album single
"Letter to Myself"	2024	22	—	—	—N/a	—	—	N/A	N/A	Letter to Myself
"Panorama" (인사)	2025	61	—	—	—	—	—	N/A	N/A	Panorama: The Best of Taeyeon
"Unspecial"	2026	TBA								Unspecial
"—" denotes a recording that did not chart or was not released in that territory N/A denotes data that are not available

=== Japanese ===
List of singles as lead artist, showing year released, selected chart positions, and name of the album
Title	Year	Peak chart positions		Album
Title	Year	JPN Hot	US World	Album
"Stay"	2018	68	13	Non-album single
"Voice"	2019	—	—	Voice
"I Do"	2019	—	—	#GirlsSpkOut
"#GirlsSpkOut" (featuring Chanmina)	2020	—	—	#GirlsSpkOut
"—" denotes a recording that did not chart or was not released in that territory

== As featured artist ==
List of singles as featured artist, showing year released, selected chart positions, sales figures, and name of the album
Title	Year	Peak chart positions			Sales	Album
Title	Year	KOR	KOR Hot	US World	Sales	Album
"You Bring Me Joy (Part 2)" (The One featuring Taeyeon)	2004	—	—	—	N/A	The One
"Shake that Brass" (Amber featuring Taeyeon)	2015	17	—	4	KOR: 112,000	Beautiful
"Scars Deeper Than Love" (사랑보다 깊은 상처) (Yim Jae-beom featuring Taeyeon)	2015	53	—	—	KOR: 72,892	Yim Jae Bum 30th Anniversary Album Project 1
"If the World Was a Perfect Place" (세상이 완벽했다면) (Verbal Jint featuring Taeyeon)	2015	25	—	—	KOR: 57,152	Go Hard, Pt. 1: Yanggachi
"Don't Forget" (잊어버리지마) (Crush featuring Taeyeon)	2016	2	—	—	KOR: 2,500,000	Non-album single
"Lonely" (Jonghyun featuring Taeyeon)	2017	1	4	6	KOR: 331,742; US: 2,000	Story Op.2
"Angel" (Chancellor featuring Taeyeon)	2019	— (Note: "Angel" did not enter the Gaon Digital Chart, but peaked at number 124 on the component Gaon Download Chart, and number 191 on the component Gaon Streaming Chart.)	—	—	N/A	Non-album single
"If I Could Tell You" (Taemin featuring Taeyeon)	2021	198	—	—	N/A	Advice
"Hate That..." (Key featuring Taeyeon)	2021	46	72	5	N/A	Bad Love
"Time Machine" (Doyoung featuring Taeyeon and Mark)	2024	119	—	—	N/A	Youth
"—" denotes a recording that did not chart or was not released in that territory N/A denotes data that are not available

== Collaborations ==
List of collaboration singles, showing year released, selected chart positions, sales figures, and name of the album
Title	Year	Peak chart positions			Sales	Album
Title	Year	KOR	KOR Hot	US World	Sales	Album
"Like a Star" (별처럼) (with The One)	2010	1	—	—	KOR: 1,050,000	Non-album single
"Different" (달라) (with Kim Bum-soo)	2011	2	—	—	KOR: 1,100,000	Non-album single
"Breath" (숨소리) (with Jonghyun)	2014	3	6	8	KOR: 530,000	SM the Ballad Vol. 2 – Breath
"Page 0" (with MeloMance)	2018	38	42	—	N/A	Station X 0
"A Train to Chuncheon" (춘천가는 기차) (with Yoon Jong-shin)	2019	162	—	—	N/A	Monthly Project 2019 Yoon Jong Shin "Hello 30"
"Let Me Go" (놓아줘) (with Crush)	2020	8	14	—	N/A	With Her
"My Love" (Duet version) (with Lee Seung-chul)	2020	86	—	—	N/A	Lee Seung-chul 35th Anniversary Album Special 'My Love'
"Night Into Days" (혼자서 걸어요) (produced by Naul)	2023	42	—	—	N/A	Naul <Ballad Pop City>
"I'm Not the Only One" (Korean version) (with Sam Smith)	2024	139	—	—	N/A	In the Lonely Hour: 10th Anniversary Edition
"Bansanka" (Korean remake) (produced by Kangnam)	2026	10	—	—	N/A	J-Pop Remake Vol. 1
"—" denotes a recording that did not chart or was not released in that territory N/A denotes data that are not available

== Soundtrack appearances ==
List of singles, showing year released, selected chart positions, sales figures, certification, and name of the album
Title	Year	Peak chart positions		Sales	Certifications	Album
Title	Year	KOR	KOR Hot	Sales	Certifications	Album
"If" (만약에)	2008	—	—	N/A	N/A	Hong Gil-dong OST
"Can You Hear Me" (들리나요...)	2008	—	—	N/A	N/A	Beethoven Virus OST
"It's Love" (사랑인걸요) (with Sunny)	2009	—	—	N/A	N/A	Heading to the Ground OST
"I Love You" (사랑해요)	2010	2	—	N/A	N/A	Athena: Goddess of War OST
"Missing You Like Crazy" (미치게 보고싶은)	2012	2	2	KOR: 1,850,000	N/A	The King 2 Hearts OST
"Closer" (가까이)	2012	7	7	KOR: 890,000	N/A	To the Beautiful You OST
"And One" (그리고 하나)	2013	2	1	KOR: 950,000	N/A	That Winter, the Wind Blows OST
"Bye"	2013	21	19	KOR: 164,000	N/A	Mr. Go OST
"Love, that One Word" (사랑 그 한마디)	2014	8	—	KOR: 490,000	N/A	You're All Surrounded OST
"All with You"	2016	14	—	KOR: 142,000	N/A	Moon Lovers: Scarlet Heart Ryeo OST
"Rescue Me"	2017	—	—	N/A	N/A	Final Life OST
"All About You" (그대라는 시)	2019	1	2	N/A	KMCA: Platinum (st.)	Hotel del Luna OST
"Into the Unknown" (숨겨진 세상)	2019	26	—	N/A	N/A	Frozen II OST
"Kiss Me" (내일은 고백할게)	2020	59	—	N/A	N/A	Do You Like Brahms? OST
"Little Garden" (나의 작은 정원)	2021	113	—	N/A	N/A	Jirisan OST
"By My Side" (내 곁에)	2022	88	—	N/A	N/A	Our Blues OST
"You and Me" (너와 나 사이)	2022	150	—	N/A	N/A	If You Wish Upon Me OST
"Dream" (꿈)	2023	18	—	N/A	N/A	Welcome to Samdal-ri OST
"Pieces" (조각)	2026	— (Note: "Pieces" did not enter the Circle Digital Chart, but peaked at number 20 on the component Circle Download Chart.)	—	N/A	N/A	We Are All Trying Here OST
"—" denotes a recording that did not chart or was not released in that territory N/A denotes data that are not available

== Other charted songs ==
List of songs, showing year released, selected chart positions, and name of the album
Title	Year	Peak chart positions			Album
Title	Year	KOR	KOR Hot	US World	Album
"Set Me Free"	2014	18	28	—	SM the Ballad Vol. 2 – Breath
"U R"	2015	3	—	—	I
"Gemini" (쌍둥이자리)	2015	9	—	—	I
"Farewell" (먼저 말해줘)	2015	12	—	—	I
"Stress" (스트레스)	2015	14	—	—	I
"Secret" (비밀)	2016	17	—	7	SM Station Season 1
"Fashion"	2016	72	—	—	Why
"Good Thing"	2016	77	—	—	Why
"Hands on Me"	2016	58	—	—	Why
"Night"	2016	68	—	—	Why
"Up & Down" (featuring Hyoyeon)	2016	84	—	—	Why
"Cover Up"	2017	13	—	—	My Voice
"Eraser"	2017	45	—	—	My Voice
"Feel So Fine" (날게)	2017	10	—	—	My Voice
"Fire"	2017	29	—	—	My Voice
"I'm OK"	2017	33	—	—	My Voice
"I Got Love"	2017	20	85	9	My Voice
"Lonely Night"	2017	34	—	—	My Voice
"Love in Color" (수체화)	2017	28	—	—	My Voice
"Sweet Love"	2017	35	—	—	My Voice
"Time Lapse"	2017	21	—	—	My Voice
"When I Was Young"	2017	27	—	—	My Voice
"I Blame On You"	2017	49	—	—	My Voice: Deluxe Edition
"Curtain Call"	2017	54	—	—	My Voice: Deluxe Edition
"Let It Snow"	2017	58	63	—	This Christmas: Winter Is Coming
"The Magic of Christmas Time"	2017	65	65	—	This Christmas: Winter Is Coming
"Christmas Without You"	2017	82	71	—	This Christmas: Winter Is Coming
"Candy Cane"	2017	88	74	—	This Christmas: Winter Is Coming
"I'm All Ears" (겨울나무)	2017	94	76	—	This Christmas: Winter Is Coming
"Shhhh" (쉿)	2017	—	77	—	This Christmas: Winter Is Coming
"All Night Long" (저녁의 이유) (featuring Lucas)	2018	72	35	—	Something New
"Circus"	2018	88	39	—	Something New
"I'm the Greatest"	2018	—	—	18	Stay
"Blue"	2019	20	24	7	Purpose
"Gravity"	2019	32	19	—	Purpose
"Here I Am"	2019	34	—	—	Purpose
"Find Me"	2019	54	—	—	Purpose
"Love You Like Crazy"	2019	55	31	—	Purpose
"Wine"	2019	65	—	—	Purpose
"Better Babe"	2019	73	—	—	Purpose
"Do You Love Me?"	2019	78	—	—	Purpose
"LOL" (하하하)	2019	87	—	—	Purpose
"City Love"	2019	91	—	—	Purpose
"Drawing Our Moments" (너를 그리는 시간)	2020	115	—	—	Purpose (Repackage)
"My Tragedy" (월식)	2020	117	—	—	Purpose (Repackage)
"Playlist"	2020	104	—	—	What Do I Call You
"To the moon"	2020	114	—	—	What Do I Call You
"Galaxy"	2020	117	—	—	What Do I Call You
"Wildfire" (들불)	2020	118	—	—	What Do I Call You
"Some Nights" (그런 밤)	2022	41	46	—	INVU
"Set Myself on Fire"	2022	87	96	—	INVU
"Toddler" (어른아이)	2022	80	—	—	INVU
"Siren"	2022	102	—	—	INVU
"Cold as Hell"	2022	109	—	—	INVU
"Timeless"	2022	95	—	—	INVU
"Heart" (품)	2022	107	—	—	INVU
"No Love Again"	2022	112	—	—	INVU
"You Better Not"	2022	111	—	—	INVU
"Ending Credits"	2022	115	—	—	INVU
"Melt Away"	2023	91	—	—	To. X
"Burn It Down"	2023	99	—	—	To. X
"Nightmare" (악몽)	2023	107	—	—	To. X
"All for Nothing"	2023	104	—	—	To. X
"Fabulous"	2023	136	—	—	To. X
"Hot Mess"	2024	111	—	—	Letter to Myself
"Blue Eyes"	2024	113	—	—	Letter to Myself
"Strangers"	2024	141	—	—	Letter to Myself
"Blur"	2024	115	—	—	Letter to Myself
"Disaster"	2024	121	—	—	Letter to Myself
"—" denotes a recording that did not chart or was not released in that territory N/A denotes data that are not available

== Other appearances ==
List of songs, showing year released, selected chart positions, sales figures, and name of the album
Title	Year	Peak chart positions	Sales	Album
Title	Year	KOR	Sales	Album
"Colorful" (컬러풀)	2014	—	N/A	Non-album single
"The Blue Night of Jeju Island" (제주도의 푸른 밤) (with Kyuhyun)	2016	11	KOR: 378,000	Thanks Band
"Altantis Princess" (아틀란티스 소녀)	2016	—	N/A	Non-album single
"Ahead of Destiny" (운명보다 한걸음 빠르게)	2020	—	N/A	Non-album single
"Fly Me to the Moon"	2022	—	N/A	Non-album single
"—" denotes a recording that did not chart or was not released in that territory N/A denotes data that are not available

== Composition credits ==
All song credits are adapted from the Korea Music Copyright Association's database unless stated otherwise.

List of songs, showing year released, artist name, and name of the album
Title	Year	Artist	Album	Lyricist	Composer	Ref.
"I" (featuring Verbal Jint)	2015	Taeyeon	I	Yes	No	N/A
"Pray"	2016 (Note: Unreleased single that was performed by Taeyeon at Taeyeon, Butterfly Kiss.)	Taeyeon	Non-album single	Yes	Yes	N/A
"To the Moon"	2020	Taeyeon	What Do I Call You	Yes	Yes	N/A
"Can't Control Myself"	2022	Taeyeon	INVU	Yes	No	N/A
"All For Nothing"	2023	Taeyeon	To. X	Yes	No	

== Music videos ==
Title	Year	Director	Ref.
"Breath" (숨소리) (with Jonghyun)	2014	Son Young & Jeon Sung-jin	
"Shake that Brass" (Amber featuring Taeyeon)	2015	Zanybros	
"I" (featuring Verbal Jint)	2015	Zanybros	
"Rain"	2016	August Frogs	
"The Blue Night of Jeju Island" (제주도의 푸른 밤) (with Kyuhyun)	2016	Pluto Sound Group	
"Starlight" (featuring Dean)	2016	Purple Straw Film (fka. Röntgen)	
"Why	2016	Purple Straw Film (fka. Röntgen)	
"Why" (Dance version)	2016	Yim Sung-kwan (Purple Straw Film)	
"11:11"	2016	Shin Hee-won	
"I Got Love"	2017	Kim Woo-je (Etui Collective)	
"Fine"	2017	Seong Chang-won	
"Make Me Love You"	2017	Oui Kim (GDW)	
"This Christmas"	2017	Shin Hee-won	
"I'm All Ears" (겨울나무)	2018	Unknown	
"Something New"	2018	Min Je-hong	
"Stay"	2018	Toshiyuki Suzuki	
"Page 0" (with MeloMance)	2018	Koh Inkon (Better Taste Studio)	
"Four Seasons" (사계)	2019	Lee Rae-kyung (BTS Film)	
"Voice"	2019	Kensaku Kakimoto	
"Spark" (불티)	2019	Lee In-hoon (Segaji Video)	
"Dear Me" (내게 들려주고 싶은 말)	2020	Lee In-hoon (Segaji Video)	
"Happy"	2020	Lee Hye-in (2eehyeinfilm)	
"#GirlsSpkOut" (featuring Chanmina)	2020	Shin Hee-won	
"Let Me Go" (놓아줘) (Crush featuring Taeyeon)	2020	Woogie Kim	
"Ahead of Destiny" (운명보다 한걸음 빠르게)	2020	Unknown	
"What Do I Call You"	2020	Lee Hye-in (2eehyeinfilm)	
"Weekend"	2021	Kim In-tae (AFF)	
"Can't Control Myself"	2022	Shin Hee-won	
"INVU"	2022	Sam Son (Son Seung-hee) (HighQualityFish)	
"INVU (Zhu Remix)"	2022	Unknown	
"To. X"	2023	EEHOSOO (cpbeq)	
"Heaven"	2024	Song Tae-jong	
"Letter to Myself"	2024	Song Tae-jong	
"Panorama"	2025	Minjae Kim	
"Bansanka"	2026	Yang Myung-hoon	
