= List of songs recorded by Taeyeon =

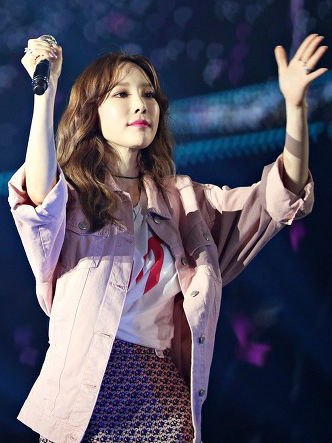
Taeyeon in 2018

This is a complete list of songs by South Korean singer Taeyeon.

== Recorded songs ==
Key
†	Indicates single/OST release

Song	Year	Writer	Album	Ref.
"11:11"†	2016	Kim Eana; Christian Vinten; Chelcee Grimes	My Voice (Deluxe Edition)	
"Ahead of Destiny" (운명보다 한걸음 빠르게)†	2020	Yoko Shimomura	Gran Saga OST	
"And One (그리고 하나)"†	2013	Kangta	That Winter, the Wind Blows OST	
"All With You"†	2016	Ji Hoon; Goo Ji-an; Seo Jae-ha; Kim Young-sung	Moon Lovers: Scarlet Heart Ryeo OST	
"All Night Long (저녁의 이유)" (featuring NCT Lucas)	2018	Kenzie; Michael Woods; Kevin White; MZMC; Yinette Claudette Mendez	Something New	
"All for Nothing"	2023	Taeyeon; Hwang Yu-bin; Mike Robinson; Sarah Troy; Thomas Daniel	To. X	
"All About You (그대라는 시)"†	2019	Ji Hoon; Park Se-jun minGtion	Hotel del Luna OST	
"A Train to Chuncheon (춘천가는 기차)"†	2019	Kim Hyun-chul; Song Sung-kyung	Monthly Project 2019 Yoon Jong Shin "Hello 30"	
"Bye"†	2013	Lee Jae-hak	Mr.Go OST	
"Breath" (with Jonghyun)†	2014	Kim Tae-seong; Jang Yeon-jung; Hwi Hyun-jun	SM the Ballad Vol. 2 – Breath	
"Baram x3 (바람 바람 바람)"	2018	Jo Yoon-kyung; Karen Poole; Sonny J. Mason; Emily Warren	Something New	
"Better Babe"	2019	Kim Bu-min; Hitchhiker; Luke R Foley; Dan Whittemore; Allison Victoria Pincsak	Purpose	
"Blue"	2019	Hyun Ji Won; JQ; Alex Mood; Mariella "Bambi" Garcia Balandina; Oskar Salhin; Mimmi Gyltman; Rassmus Björnson	Purpose	
"Blue Eyes"	2024	Han Ro-ro; Chantry Johnson; Ryan Follese; Alexander DeLeon	Letter to Myself	
"Blur"	2024	Choi In-yeong (Sweden Laundry); Wang Se-yun (Sweden Laundry); Meron MengistMike Squillante; Nick "Squids" Squillante	Letter to Myself	
"Be Real"	2020	BOYHOOD (Digz Inc.); Joe Lawrence	#GirlsSpkOut	
"Burn It Down"	2023	Lee O-neul; Sibel Redžep; Gustav Blomberg	To. X	
"By My Side (내 곁에)"†	2022	Punch; Jihoon riskypizza	Our Blues OST	
"Can You Hear Me? (들리나요)"†	2008	Lim Bo-kyung; Lee Sang-jun; Cha Gil-wan	Beethoven Virus OST	
"Closer (가까이)"†	2012	Kim Jeong-bae; Kenzie	To the Beautiful You OST	
"Cover Up"	2017	Realmeee; Grades; Caroline Ailin	My Voice	
"Curtain Call"	2017	Jang Jun-yeong; Peter Wallevik; Daniel Davidsen; Tebey Ottoh; Noel Salmon	My Voice (Deluxe Edition)	
"Candy Cane"	2017	Hwang Hyun; Matthew Tishler; Philip Bentley; Aimee Proal	This Christmas: Winter Is Coming	
"Christmas Without You"	2017	Jo Yoon-kyung; Daniel Obi Klein; Charli Taft; Andreas Öberg	This Christmas: Winter Is Coming	
"Circus"	2018	Jo Yoon-kyung; Denniz Jamm; Allison Kaplan; Le`mon	Something New	
"City Love"	2019	Ji Yu-ri (Jam Factory); Mike Daley; Mitchell Owens; Christine 'Mickey Blue' Gallagher; Realmeee	Purpose	
"Can't Control Myself"†	2022	Taeyeon; Moon Seol-ri; Celine Svanbäck; Mich Hansen; Lauritz Emil Christiansen; Jacob Ubizz; Ryan Jhun	INVU	
"Cold as Hell"	2022	Cha Yu-bin; Lara Andersson; Manon van Dijk; Amanda Cygnaeus; Marcus van Wattum; Nova Blue; Kasperi A. Pitkanen	INVU	
"Different (달라)" (with Kim Bum-soo)	2011	Park Sun Zoo 돈스파이크 (Don Spike)	Solista, Pt. 2	
"Disaster"	2024	Bay (153/Joombas); Ephy (153/Joombas); GiGi Grombacher; Rob Resnick; Sarah de Warren	Letter to Myself	
"Do You Love Me?"	2019	Lee Joo-hyoung (MonoTree)	Purpose	
"Dear Me (내게 들려주고 싶은 말)"†	2020	Hwang Yura (Jam Factory); Yoo Ji Won (Lara Las Studios); William Wenaus; Yoo Young-jin	Purpose (Repackage)	
"Drawing Our Moments (너를 그리는 시간)"	2020	Jo Yoon-Kyung; Lawrence Lee; Malin Johansson; Dan Sundquist; Hjalmar wilén	Purpose (Repackage)	
"Dream" (꿈)	2023	Cho Yong-pil; Lee Joo-hyoung (MonoTree); Kwon Ji-yoon	Welcome to Samdal-ri OST	
"Eraser"	2017	Mafly; Lee Seu-ran; Dillon Pace; Sean Douglas; Felicia Barton	My Voice	
"Ending Credits"	2022	Ji Ye-won (153/Joombas); Mich Hansen; Jeppe London Bilsby; Celine Svanbäck; Sam Merrifield	INVU	
"Fabulous"	2023	Rachel Kanner; Sammie Gee; Mich Hansen; Jacob Uchorczak; Oliver McEwan; Ubizz	To. X	
"Farewell (먼저 말해줘)"	2015	Lee Joo-hyung (MonoTree); Chu Dae-kwan (MonoTree)	I	
"Fashion"	2016	Kim In-hyung; LDN Noise; Marissa Shipp; Brittany Mullen	Why	
"Fine"†	2017	Jin Ri; Michael Woods; Kevin White; Andrew Bazzi; Shaylen Carroll; MZMC	My Voice	
"Feel So Fine (날게)"	2017	Moon Hye-min; Courtney Woolsey; Daniel Durn; Katrine "Neya" Klith; Johan Gustafsson; Sebastian Lundberg; Fredrik Häggstam	My Voice	
"Fire"	2017	JQ; Jo Mi-yang; Myah Marie Langston; Bennett Armstrong; Justin Armstrong; Carah Faye Daren Rauer	My Voice	
"Four Seasons (사계)"	2019	Kenzie; Josh Cumbee; Afshin Salmani; Andrew Allen	Purpose	
"Find Me"	2019	Moon Hye-min; Mike Daley; Mitchell Owens; Bianca 'Blush' Atterberry	Purpose	
"Fly Me to the Moon"	2022	Bart Howard	Moonlight Blade M OST	
"Gemini (쌍둥이자리)"	2015	Jam Factory; Mafly; LDN Noise; Carolyn Jordan; Alice Sophie Penrose	I	
"Good Thing"	2016	Jung Joo-hee; LDN Noise; Alice Sophie Penrose; Carolyn Jordan	Why	
"Gravity"	2019	JQ; Moon Ye-rin(makeumine works); Lance Shipp; Rachael Kennedy; Nathalia Marshall; Angel Lopez; Gilde Flores	Purpose	
"Galaxy"	2020	Zaya (Joombas); Mariella "Bambi" Garcia Balandina (Mr Radar); Mimmi Gyltman; MooF (Joombas)	What Do I Call You	
"#GirlsSpkOut" (featuring Chanmina)†	2020	eill Chanmina; Megan Lee; Shawn Halim; Adien Lewis (WayBetta); Willie Weeks	#GirlsSpkOut	
"Hands on Me"	2016	Yorkie; Ryu Woo; Harvey Mason Jr. Damon Thomas; Dewain Whitmore; Michael "Mike J" Jiminez	Why	
"Here I Am"	2019	Jo Yoon-Kyung; Matthew Tishler; Allison Kaplan	Purpose	
"Horizon"	2019	Ishiwatari Jyunji; Geek Boy Al Swettenham; Megan Lee; Andy Love	Voice	
"Happy"†	2020	Lee Seu Ran (Jam Factory); Chris Wahle; Chelcee Grimes; Samuel Gerongco; Robert Gerongco	What Do I Call You	
"Heart (품)"	2022	Lee Yi-jin (153/Joombas); Cameron Warren; Connie Talbot; Ryan Jhun	INVU	
"Heaven"†	2024	Dino Medanhodzic; Maia Wright; Libby Whitehouse; Lee Oh-neul; Leslie; Moon Ji-young (Lalala Studio); Jo Yoon-kyung	Non-album single	
"Hot Mess"	2024	Cha Yi-rin (153/Joombas); Tommy Driscoll; Larzz Principato; Upsahl	Letter to Myself	
"If (만약에)"†	2008	Song Jae-won; Kim Jun-beom; Lee Chang-hee	Hong Gildong OST	
"I Love You (사랑해요)"	2010	Ahn Youngmin; Lee Soo-man	Athena: Goddess of War OST	
"I" (featuring Verbal Jint)†	2015	Taeyeon; Mafly; Verbal Jint; Myah Marie Langston; Bennett Armstrong; Justin T. Armstrong; Cosmopolitan Douglas; David Quinones; Jon Asher; Ryan S. Jhun	I	
"I Got Love"†	2017	Kenzie; Thomas Troelsen; Eyelar Mirzazadeh	My Voice	
"I'm OK"	2017	Yorkie; Ryu Woo; Devine-Channel; Tyler Sharny; Diana Salvatore; Fabio BOI Angelini	My Voice	
"I Blame on You"	2017	Yorkie; Devine Channel; Lena Leon; Aurora Pfeiffer; Ryan Henderson; Richard Beynon	My Voice (Deluxe Edition)	
"I'm All Ears (겨울나무)"	2017	Lee Joo-hyung; Astrid Holiday	This Christmas: Winter Is Coming	
"I'm The Greatest"	2018	Junji Ishiwatari; Joakim Dalqvist	Stay	
"I Found You"	2019	Ishiwatari Jyunji; Sebastian Thott; Andreas Oberg; Skylar Mones; Courtney Woolsey	Voice	
"Into The Unknown (숨겨진 세상)"†	2019	Kristen Anderson-Lopez; Robert Lopez	Frozen 2 OST	
"I Do"†	2019	MEG.ME; Celine Helgemo; Sebastian Aasen; Per Kristian Ottestad; Sheila Simmenes	#GirlsSpkOut	
"INVU"†	2022	Jinli (Full8loom); Peter Wallevik (PhD); Daniel Davidsen (PhD); Rachel Furner; Jess Morgan	INVU	
"Kiss Me (내일은 고백할게)"†	2020	Ji Hoon; Bae Jin-young; Jay Kim; Ashley Alisha (153/Joombas); Hyuk Shin (153/Joombas)	Do You Like Brahms? OST	
"Like a Star (별처럼)" (with The One)†	2010	Cho Yeong-su	The One《4th Part1... 다시 걷는다》	
"Love, that One Word (사랑 그 한마디)"†	2014	Choi Jae-woo; Kim Se-jin; Park Chan	You're All Surrounded OST	
"Lonely Night"	2017	Kenzie	My Voice	
"Love in Color (수채화)"	2017	Lee Yoon-seol; Myah Marie Langston; Krysta Youngs	My Voice	
"Let It Snow"	2017	Agnes Shin; Simon Petrén; Chu Dae-kwan	This Christmas: Winter Is Coming	
"Letter to Myself"†	2024	Ha Yoo-na (153/Joombas); Dino Medanhodzic; Johanna Jansson; Rena Lovelis; Nia Lovelis]] Casey Moreta	Letter to Myself	
"Love You Like Crazy"	2019	Kenzie; LDN Noise	Purpose	
"LOL (하하하)	2019	ron Kang Eun-jung dress glowingdog Kriz 아신애	Purpose	
"Let Me Go (놓아줘)" (with Crush)†	2020	Crush; Kim Mandy	With Her	
"Little Garden (나의 작은 정원)"†	2021	Lee Joo-hyeong (MonoTree) jun-p (MonoTree); Gaemi	Jirisan Original Soundtrack	
"Missing You Like Crazy (미치게 보고싶은)"†	2012	Lee Pilho	The King 2 Hearts OST	
"Make Me Love You"†	2017	Cho Yun-kyung; Aaron Benward; Matthew Tishler; Felicia Barton	My Voice (Deluxe Edition)	
"Melt Away"	2023	Kang Eun-jeong; Kevin Wolfsohn; Paul Goller; Zara Larsson; Luke Andrew Grieve; Shakka Malcolm Philip; Abby-Lynn Keen	To. X	
"My Tragedy (월식)"	2020	Kim Bu-min; Hitchhiker; Daniel Whittemore; Bonx; Elizabeth Russo	Purpose (Repackage)	
"My Love (Duet version)" (with Lee Seung-chul)	2020	Jeon Jeon; Lee Joo-hyeong (MonoTree); Kim Moon-jeong	Lee Seung Chul 35th Anniversary Album Special ‘My Love’	
"Night"	2016	Ryu Woo; YorkieIm Kwang-wook; Ryan Kim; Chase; Amanda Moseley	Why	
"Nightmare"	2023	Hanroro; Celine Svanbäck; Jeppe London Bilsby; Lauritz Emil Christiansen; Svea Kågemark	To. X	
"No Love Again"	2022	Kang Eun-jung; Alma Guðmundsdóttir; Alida Garpestad; Peck Marc Sibley; Nathan Cunningham; Space Primates	INVU	
"One Day (너의 생일)"	2018	Jo Yoon-kyung; Mike Woods; Kevin White; MZMC; The Heavy Group; Yinette Claudette Mendez; Kiana Brown	Something New	
"Page 0" (featuring MeloMance)†	2018	Kim Min-seok (MeloMance); Simon Janlöv; Adam Benyahia; Jeong Dong-hwan (MeloMance)	Station x 0	
"Panorama"†	2025	Mola; Mary Josephine Young; Keith Varon; JT Foley; Alida Peck	Panorama: The Best of Taeyeon	
"Pieces"†	2026	Ant; Klozer; Sondia	We Are All Trying Here OST	
"Playlist"	2020	Jeon Ji-eun (January 8 (lalala Studio)); Hwang Seon-jeong (January 8 (lalala Studio)); Kim Jeong-mi (January 8 (lalala Studio)); Mike Daley; Mitchell Owens; Nicole "Kole" Cohen	What Do I Call You	
"Rain"†	2016	Bong Eun-yeong; Mafly; Lee Yoo-jin; Matthew Tishler; Aaron Benward; Felicia Barton; Olivia Holt	SM Station Season 1	
"Rescue Me"†	2017	Junji Ishiwatari; Steven Lee; Sean Alexander; Jimmy Burney; Pascal Guyon	Final Life: Even If You Disappear Tomorrow OST	
"Set Me Free"	2014	Jo Kyu-man	SM the Ballad Vol.2 – Breath	
"Stress (스트레스)"	2015	Mafly; Hyuk Shin; Tiffany Evans; Marco Reyes (MRey); DK	I	
"Starlight" (featuring Dean)†	2016	Lee Seu-ran; Jamil "Digi" Chammas; Taylor Mckall; Tay Jasper; Adrian McKinnon; Leven Kali; Sara Forsberg; MZMC	Why	
"Secret (비밀)"	2016	Mafly; Devine Kei; Ryan Kim; Aurora Pfeiffer; Tyler Shamy; Thaddeus Dixon; Kiana Brown	SM Station Season 1	
"Sweet Love"	2017	Kenzie; The Stereotypes; Racquelle "Rahky" Anteola	My Voice	
"Shhhh (쉿)"	2017	Won Tae-yeon; Jae Ha; Christopher Wortley; Mahan Moin; DWB	This Christmas: Winter Is Coming	
"Something New"†	2018	Ji Yu Ri; Dwayne "Dem Jointz" Abernathy; Macy Maloy; Ryan S. Jhun; Yoo Young-jin	Something New	
"Stay"†	2018	Sara Sakurai; Christian Fast; Sebastian Thott; Ellen Berg Tollbom	Stay	
"Spark (불티)"†	2019	Kenzie; Anne Judith Wik; Ronny Svendsen	Purpose	
"Signal"	2019	STY; Ricky Hanley; Christie Prentice; Daniel Sherman	Voice	
"Sorrow"	2020	Sara Sakurai (T's Music) minGtion (ADC Music); E Jae	#GirlsSpkOut	
"Set Myself on Fire"	2022	Kenzie; Alna Hofmeyr; Michael Dunaief; Ryland Holland; Hamid Bashir; Stryv	INVU	
"Siren"	2022	Mok Ji-min (lalala Studio); Mike Daley; Mitchell Owens; Rodnae 'Chikk' Bell; Nicole 'Kole' Cohen	INVU	
"Some Nights (그럼 밤)"	2022	Kim Eana; Edvard Grieg; Simon Petrén; Andreas Öberg	INVU	
"Strangers"	2024	Ha Yoo-na (153/Joombas); Anthony M. Jones; Lauren Larue; Lindsey Lomis	Letter to Myself	
"The Blue Night of Jeju Island (제주도의 푸른 밤)"†	2016	Choi Seong-won; Jang Young-soo	Thanks Band	
"Time Lapse"	2017	Kim Jong-wan; ZOOEY	My Voice	
"Time Spent Walking Through Memories" (기억을 걷는 시간)" (CD Only)	2017	Kim Jong-wan; Hong So-jin	My Voice	
"The Magic of Christmas Time"	2017	Krysta Youngs; Robin Ghosh; Yan Perchuk; Ruslan Sirota; Myah Marie	This Christmas: Winter Is Coming	
"This Christmas"†	2017	Score (13); Megatone	This Christmas: Winter Is Coming	
"Turnt and Burnt"	2019	STY; Willie Weeks; Yanka Lena	Voice	
"To the Moon"	2020	Taeyeon; Yorkie (Devine Channel); SOLE (Devine Channel); Im Kwang-wook (Devine Channel); Ryan Kim (Devine Channel); Andreas "Mage" Maggiani (Devine Channel); SOLE (Devine Channel); Sakehands	What Do I Call You	
"Timeless"	2022	Jo Yung-yeong; Alida Garpestad Peck; Sean Fischer; Ben Samama	INVU	
"Toddler (어른아이)"	2022	Kang Eun-jung; Aeon; Salem Ilese; William Leong	INVU	
"To. X"†	2023	Kenzie; Stephen Puth; Dazy; Kristin Carpenter	To. X	
"U R"	2015	Jo Yun-gyeong; Matthew Tishler; Robyn Newman; Ben Charles	I	
"Up & Down" (featuring Hyoyeon)	2016	Lee Seu-ran; Kim Min-ji; Ylva Dimberg; Herbie Crichlow; LDN Noise	Why	
"Voice"†	2019	STY; Aaron Benward; Felicia Barton; Matthew Tishler	Voice	
"Vanilla"	2019	Sara Sakurai; Joe Lawrence; Linda Quero	Voice	
"Why"†	2016	Jo Yoon-kyung; LDN Noise; Lauren Dyson; Rodnae "Chikk" Bell	Why	
"When I Was Young"	2017	Lee Joo-hyung (MonoTree)	My Voice	
"Wine"	2019	Jo Yoon-Kyung; Robin Gosh; Krysta Youngs; Kim Viera; David Quinones	Purpose	
"Worry Free Love"	2020	MEG.ME; Andreas Carlsson; Melanie Joy Fontana; Michel "Lindgren" Schulz	#GirlsSpkOut	
"What Do I Call You"†	2020	Kenzie; Linnea Södahl; Caroline Pennell; David Pramik	What Do I Call You	
"Wildfire (들불)"	2020	Jo Yoon-kyung; Blaq Tuxedo; Michael Jiminez; IMLAY	What Do I Call You	
"Weekend"†	2021	Hwang Yu-bin; RoseInPeace; Saimon; Willemijn van der Neut; Marcia "Misha" Sondeijker	Non-album single	
"You Better Not"	2022	Moon Seol-ri; Celine Svanbäck; Hilda Stenmalm; Jeppe London Bilsby; Ryan Jhun	INVU	
"You and Me (너와 나 사이)" †	2022	Noheul	If You Wish Upon Me OST	
