= Taeyeon albums discography =

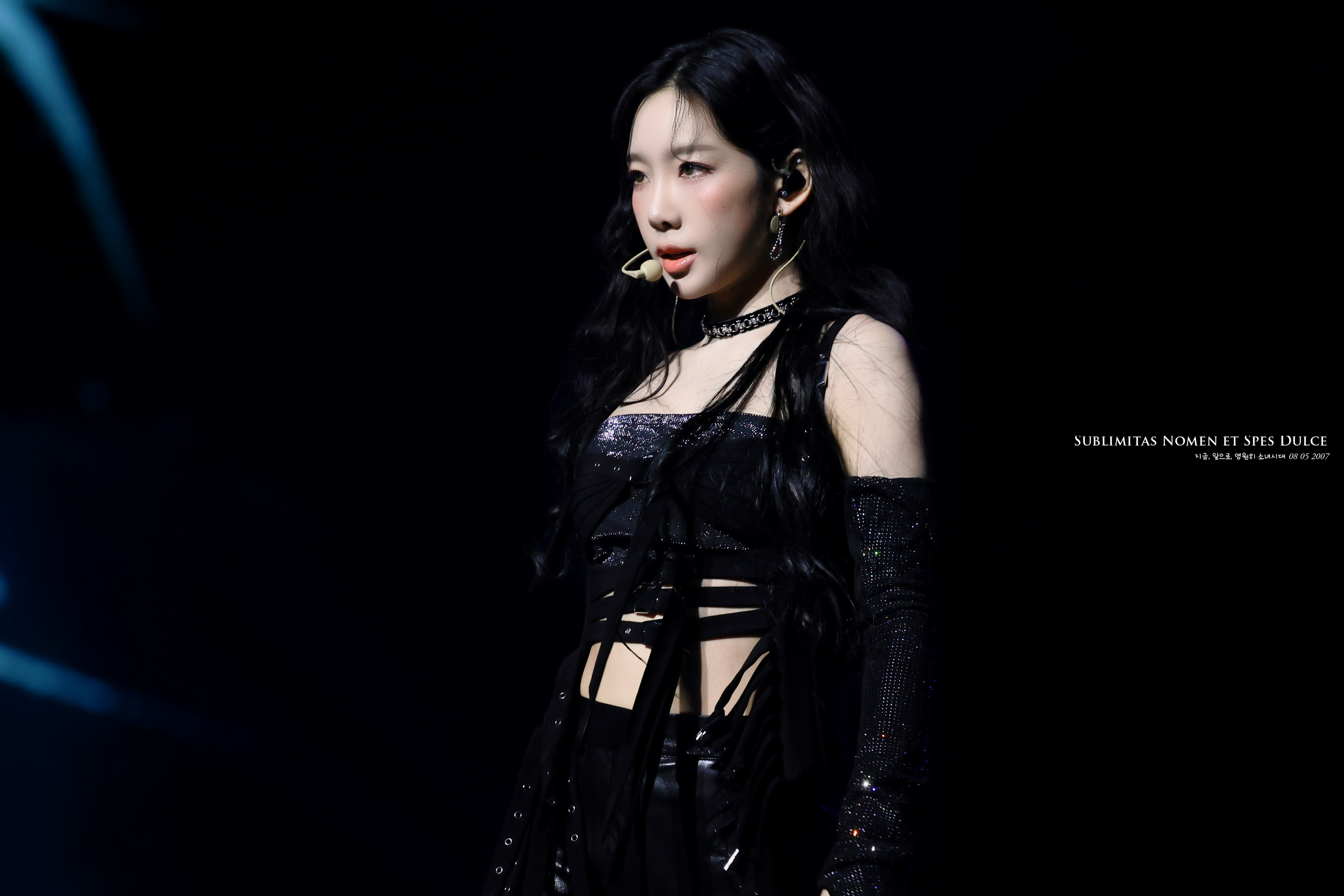
- Taeyeon performing at The Tense concert in Seoul in March 2025
- Studio albums: 3
- EPs: 8
- Reissues: 2

South Korean singer Taeyeon has released three studio albums, two studio-album reissues, and seven extended plays (EPs). She first became a singer as part of idol girl group Girls' Generation in August 2007, and she has embarked on a solo career since 2015. By September 2019, Taeyeon was the best-selling female solo idol and the fifth-best-selling female idol in terms of album sales. She surpassed one million album sales in January 2022 and had sold over 1.3 million albums by September 2023.

SM Entertainment released Taeyeon's debut EP, I, in October 2015. It peaked at number two in South Korea and has sold over 173,000 physical copies. Her second EP, Why (2016), reached number one in South Korea and has sold over 126,000 physical copies. Taeyeon sold over 250,000 physical copies of her first studio album, My Voice (2017), and its deluxe-edition reissue. Both versions of My Voice peaked at number one in South Korea.

Taeyeon further released two South Korean top-five EPs, This Christmas: Winter Is Coming (2017) and Something New (2018), and a Japanese top-ten EP, Voice (2019). Her second studio album, Purpose (2019), and its reissue (2020) both peaked at number two in South Korea, and their cumulative sales stood at over 232,000 copies. Taeyeon's 2020 EP, What Do I Call You, peaked at number four in South Korea and sold over 127,000 copies combining CD and vinyl sales. Her third studio album, INVU (2022), peaked at number two in South Korea and has sold over 248,000 physical copies.

== Studio albums ==
List of studio albums, showing selected details, selected chart positions, and sales figures
Title	Details	Peak chart positions							Sales
Title	Details	KOR	AUS Dig.	FRA Dig.	JPN	US Heat.	US Ind.	US World	Sales
My Voice	Released: February 28, 2017; Label: SM; Formats: CD, digital download, streaming	1	—	—	39	19	43	2	KOR: 151,000
Purpose	Released: October 28, 2019; Label: SM; Formats: CD, digital download, streaming	2	23	73	25	14	41	9	KOR: 172,000; JPN: 3,000
INVU	Released: February 14, 2022; Label: SM; Formats: CD, cassette, LP, digital download, streaming	2	—	—	18	20	—	—	KOR: 248,000; JPN: 4,000
Unspecial	Scheduled: November 30, 2026; Label: SM; Formats: CD, digital download, streaming	To be released							
"—" denotes a recording that did not chart or was not released in that territory

=== Reissues ===
List of reissues albums, showing selected details, selected chart positions, and sales figures
Title	Details	Peak chart positions	Sales
Title	Details	KOR	Sales
My Voice: Deluxe Edition	Released: April 5, 2017; Label: SM; Formats: CD, Kihno kit, digital download, streaming	1	KOR: 106,000
Purpose (Repackage)	Released: January 15, 2020; Label: SM; Formats: CD, Kihno kit, digital download, streaming	2	KOR: 60,000

== Compilation albums ==
List of compilation albums, showing selected details, selected chart positions, and sales figures
Title	Details	Peak chart positions	Sales
Title	Details	KOR	Sales
Panorama: The Best of Taeyeon	Released: December 1, 2025; Label: SM; Formats: CD, LP, digital download, streaming	2	KOR: 140,998

== Extended plays ==
=== Korean ===
List of extended plays, showing selected details, selected chart positions, and sales figures
Title	Details	Peak chart positions					Sales
Title	Details	KOR	JPN	US Heat.	US Ind.	US World	Sales
I	Released: October 7, 2015; Label: SM; Formats: CD, LP, Kihno kit, digital download, streaming	2	21	5	38	1	KOR: 173,000; US: 2,000
Why	Released: June 28, 2016; Label: SM; Formats: CD, Kihno kit, digital download, streaming	1	30	15	48	2	KOR: 126,000
This Christmas: Winter Is Coming	Released: December 12, 2017; Label: SM; Formats: CD, digital download, streaming	2	—	—	—	6	KOR: 69,000
Something New	Released: June 18, 2018; Label: SM; Formats: CD, digital download, streaming	3	35	—	—	4	KOR: 78,000
What Do I Call You	Released: December 15, 2020; Label: SM; Formats: CD, LP, digital download, streaming	4	—	—	—	—	KOR: 127,000
To. X	Released: November 27, 2023; Label: SM; Formats: CD, LP, digital download, streaming	2	—	—	—	—	KOR: 155,027; JPN: 334
Letter to Myself	Released: November 18, 2024; Label: SM; Formats: CD, LP, digital download, streaming	4	—	—	—	—	KOR: 130,448
"—" denotes a recording that did not chart or was not released in that territory

=== Japanese ===
List of extended plays, showing selected details, selected chart positions, and sales figures
Title	Details	Peak chart positions		Sales
Title	Details	JPN	US World	Sales
Voice	Released: June 5, 2019; Label: EMI Records, Universal Music Japan; Formats: CD, digital download, streaming	6	11	JPN: 19,000
#GirlsSpkOut	Released: November 18, 2020 (JPN); Label: EMI Records, Universal Music Japan; Formats: CD, digital download, streaming	9	—	JPN: 5,000
"—" denotes a recording that did not chart or was not released in that territory
