= The Tense =

2025 concert tour by Taeyeon

Taeyeon Concert – The Tense
- Asia tour by Taeyeon
- Promotional poster of the tour in Seoul, South Korea
- Location: Asia
- Associated album: To. X Letter to Myself
- Start date: March 7, 2025
- End date: June 7, 2025
- Legs: 1
- No. of shows: 13

Taeyeon concert chronology
- The Odd of Love (2023); The Tense (2025)

The Tense (stylized as TAEYEON CONCERT – The TENSE) was the sixth concert tour and the second arena tour headlined by South Korean singer Taeyeon, in support of her two EPs To. X (2023) and Letter to Myself (2024). The tour commenced on March 7, 2025 in Seoul and concluded on June 7, 2025 in Hong Kong. The tour consists of thirteen concerts across eight cities and seven countries in Asia. It was her first solo concert in nearly two years, since The Odd of Love in 2023.

== Background ==
On January 7, 2025, SM Entertainment announced that Taeyeon would hold her first Asian tour, titled "The Tense", since her previous tour The Odd of Love in 2023. The tour is set to kick off with three consecutive shows at the KSPO Dome in South Korea from March 7 to her birthday on March 9. The tour will also visit Taiwan and the Philippines in the same month, before heading to Indonesia and Macau in April. In May and June, Taeyeon will perform for two nights at the Singapore Indoor Stadium in Singapore and Impact Arena in Thailand, before concluding the tour in Hong Kong on June 7. On February 12, SMTown Japan added two more shows in April in Ariake Arena in Japan, bringing the total number of regions she will hold concerts in to nine. On March 17, Sunny Side Up Entertainment announced an additional show to be held on April 27 in Macau, bringing her total number of shows to fifteen.

With her show in Taiwan, Taeyeon will become the first foreign singer to headline a concert at the Taipei Dome, the largest indoor-stadium in the country. (Note: Taipei Dome is the largest indoor venue in Taiwan.) She will also become the third artist to hold a concert at Taipei Dome, following Taiwanese artists Jay Chou and A-Mei. She will also become the first South Korean soloist to hold a concert at Indonesia Arena, which is the largest indoor arena in Indonesia.

== Commercial performance ==
=== Ticket sales ===
The ticket sales for the concerts in Seoul were split into a fan club pre-sale and a general sale. The fan club pre-sale will begin on January 14, 2025 while the general sale will begin January 16. Online reservations can be made on Melon Ticket. All tickets are priced ₩154,000. On January 15, SM Entertainment announced that all tickets for her 3-day concert in Seoul were sold out through the pre-sale for fanclub members on January 14. On February 7, SM Entertainment announced on Weverse that the organizer would add more seats with obstructed views for all three shows in Seoul.

On February 8, Farglory Creative Taiwan recorded over tens of thousands people accessing the ticketing website at the same time, all tickets for the show at Taipei Dome were sold out in seconds. On February 14, Farglory Creative Taiwan announced that the organizer would add 20 zones of seats with obstructed views for the show in Taipei Dome. On February 17, SM Entertainment announced that the additional obstructed-view seats for her three concert dates at KSPO Dome and one concert date at Taipei Dome had all been sold out, respectively.

The concerts in Seoul were attended by more than 30,000 people, including Red Velvet's Seulgi, Got7's BamBam, Mamamoo's Solar and Moonbyul, Ive's Liz, Hanhae, P.O, Jaejae, Lami and Seungheon.

On March 13, Sunny Side Up Entertainment announced that all tickets for the concert in Macau had been sold out. On March 21, all tickets for the additional show on April 27 in Macau were sold out during the general sale. On April 16, the ticket website Cityline Hong Kong announced that all tickets for the concert in Hong Kong had been sold out.

== Promotion ==
To celebrate Taeyeon's 10th solo debut anniversary and promote the tour, her live performance at KSPO Dome in Seoul on March 8 will be exclusive broadcast live viewing at 17 Megabox movie theaters in South Korea and various international theaters, including in Japan's Live Viewing, Taiwan's Vieshow Cinemas, Thailand's Paragon Cineplex, Indonesia's CGV Cinemas, Singapore's Golden Village, Malaysia's Golden Screen Cinemas, Hong Kong's Broadway Circuit, Emperor Cinemas and MCL Cinemas. The live viewing will be screened with integrated Dolby Cinema and Dolby Atmos auditoriums. Meanwhile, the performance in Seoul on March 9 was simultaneously live-streamed via the global platforms Weverse and Beyond Live.

== Reception ==
In a positive review for IZM, Jeong Gi-yeop wrote that the tour's Seoul opening stop was "unrelenting grandeur—massive screens, temple staircases, synchronized dancers, and confetti showers; transforming from the simpler setup of Taeyeon's previous tour, "The Odd of Love" into a meticulously crafted, immersive spectacle across all 25 songs". Meanwhile, Lee Ji-an from Korea JoongAng Daily praised Taeyeon as a "textbook idol" and said this highest compliment "does not do justice to her performance during her solo concert series The Tense". In Lee's review, she noted that "Taeyeon's musical talent conveyed glimmers of the artist's own complexities, submerged in music — refusing to be defined by any tool of measure".

== Set list ==
The following set list is from the concert on March 7, 2025, in Seoul, South Korea, and is not intended to represent all shows throughout the tour.

1. "Fabulous"
2. "I"
3. "Letter to Myself"
4. "Blue Eyes"
5. "Make Me Love You"
6. "Heaven"
7. "Hot Mess"
8. "Cold As Hell"
9. "INVU"
10. "My Tragedy"
11. "Melt Away"
12. "To. X"
13. "What Do I Call You"
14. "Weekend"
15. "Stress"
16. "Why"
17. "Baram X 3"
18. "Four Seasons"
19. "Disaster"
20. "Ending Credits"
21. "Time Lapse"
22. "All For Nothing"
23. "Blur"

Encore:

24. "Curtain Call"
25. "U R"

== Tour dates ==
Key
‡	Indicates performance streamed simultaneously on Weverse and Beyond Live
†	Indicates performance streamed simultaneously in cinemas

List of concert dates
Date	City	Country	Venue	Attendance	Revenue
March 7, 2025	Seoul	South Korea	KSPO Dome	30,000	—
March 8, 2025 †	Seoul	South Korea	KSPO Dome	30,000	—
March 9, 2025 ‡	Seoul	South Korea	KSPO Dome	30,000	—
March 16, 2025	Taipei	Taiwan	Taipei Dome	36,000	$4,350,000
March 29, 2025	Pasay (Note: Labelled as Manila in promotional material.)	Philippines	SM Mall of Asia Arena	—	—
April 12, 2025	Jakarta	Indonesia	Indonesia Arena	—	—
April 26, 2025	Macau		Venetian Arena	20,000	—
April 27, 2025	Macau		Venetian Arena	20,000	—
May 3, 2025	Singapore		Singapore Indoor Stadium	—	—
May 4, 2025	Singapore		Singapore Indoor Stadium	—	—
May 31, 2025	Bangkok	Thailand	Impact Arena	—	—
June 1, 2025	Bangkok	Thailand	Impact Arena	—	—
June 7, 2025	Hong Kong		AsiaWorld–Arena	10,000	—
Total				N/A	

=== Cancelled shows ===
List of cancelled concerts
Date	City	Country	Venue	Reason
April 19, 2025	Tokyo	Japan	Ariake Arena	Equipment delay
April 20, 2025	Tokyo	Japan	Ariake Arena	Equipment delay

== Personnel ==
- Artist: Taeyeon
- Tour organizers: SM Entertainment, CJ ENM, SM True (Thailand), Farglory Creative (Taiwan), YJ Partners (Taiwan), On The Line (Japan), Dyandra Global Edutainment (Indonesia), PULP Live World (Philippines) Sunny Side Up Entertainment (Hong Kong & Macau), Rolemodel Entertainment Group (Hong Kong & Macau), Chessman Entertainment (Macau), and iME Entertainment (Singapore).
- Ticketing partners: Melon Ticket (South Korea), TixCraft (Taiwan), Lokét (Indonesia), SM Tickets (Philippines), Ticket Board (Japan), Cotai Ticketing (Macau), Damai.cn (Hong Kong & Macau), Bookyay (Macau), Ticketmaster (Singapore), All Ticket by 7-Eleven (Thailand) and Cityline Ticketing (Hong Kong).

== Footnotes ==
Show details
