= Taeyeon discography =

Taeyeon discography may refer to:

- Taeyeon albums discography
- Taeyeon singles discography
- List of songs recorded by Taeyeon
