= List of Circle Digital Chart number ones of 2024 =

The Circle Digital Chart is a chart that ranks the best-performing singles in South Korea. Managed by the domestic Ministry of Culture, Sports and Tourism (MCST), its data is compiled by the Korea Music Content Industry Association and published by the Circle Chart. The ranking is based collectively on each single's download sales, stream count, and background music use. The Circle Chart provides weekly (listed from Sunday to Saturday), monthly, and yearly lists for the chart.

== Weekly charts ==
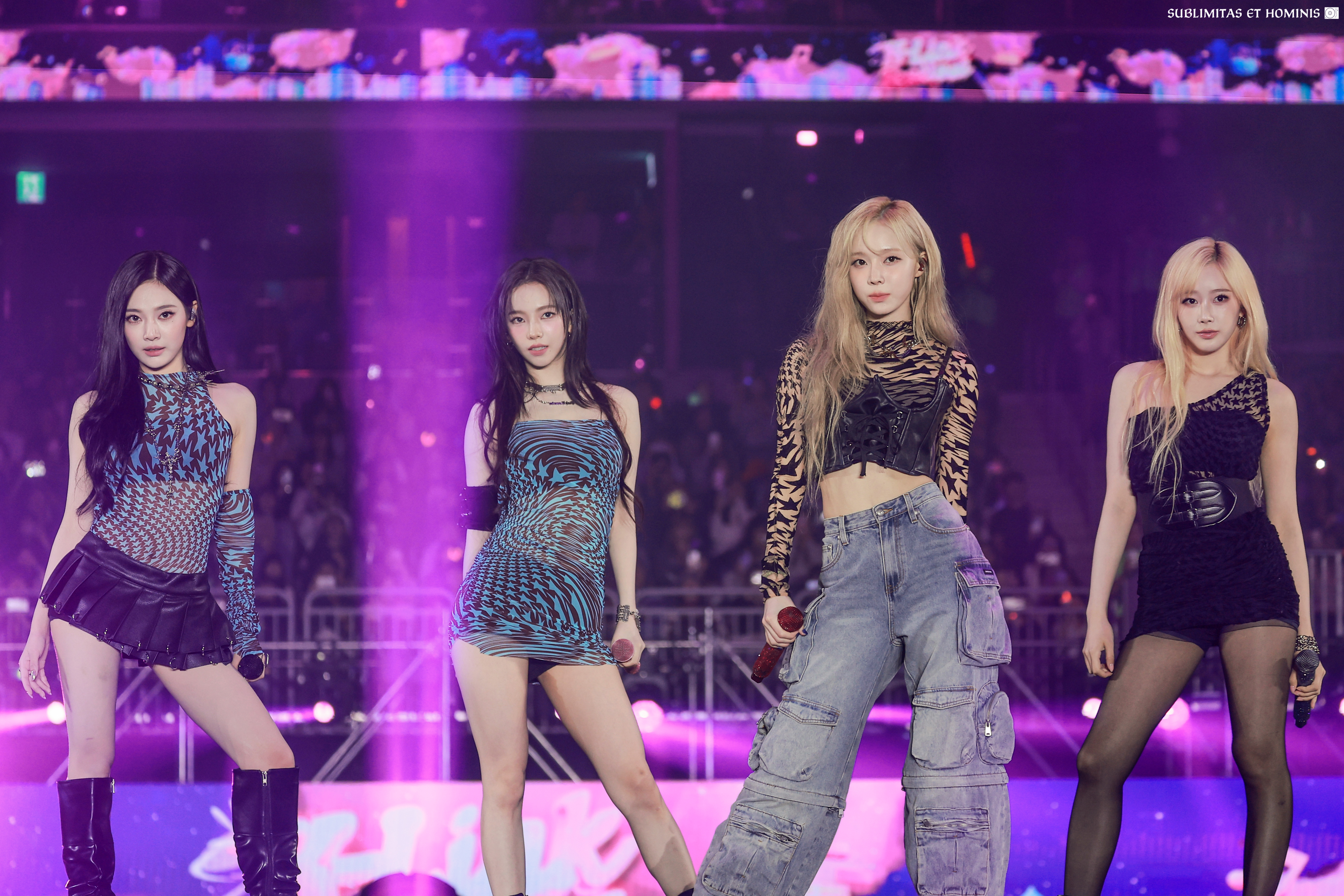
Aespa's "Supernova" was the best-performing single of 2024 and spent 11 weeks atop the chart and three months atop the monthly chart.

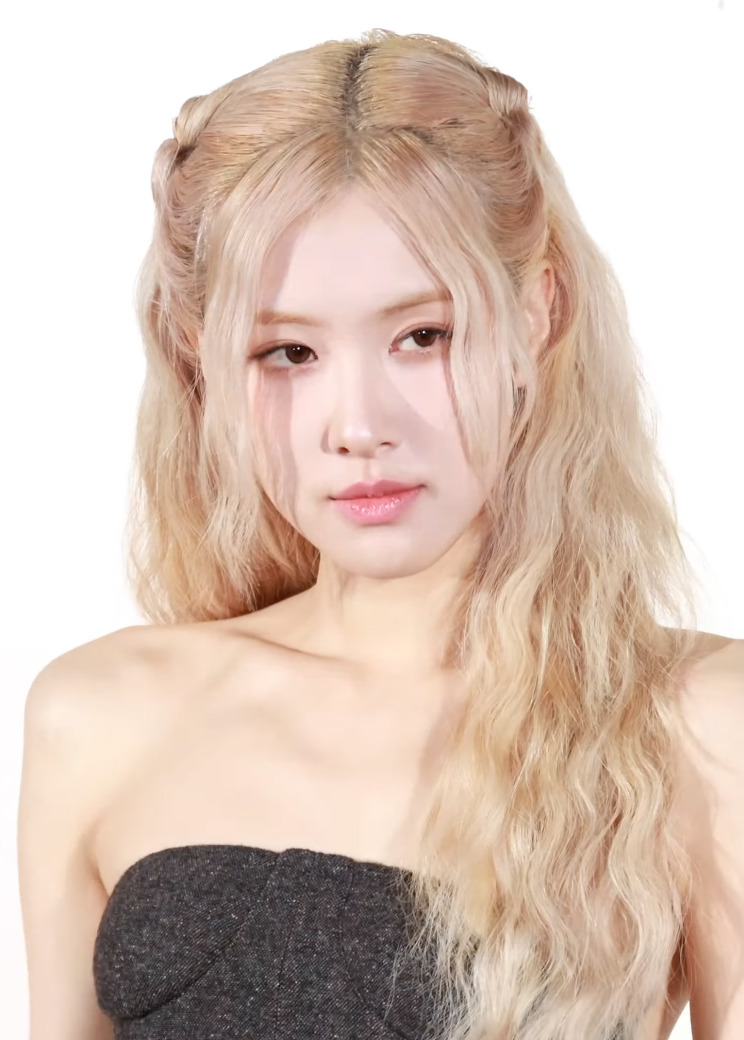
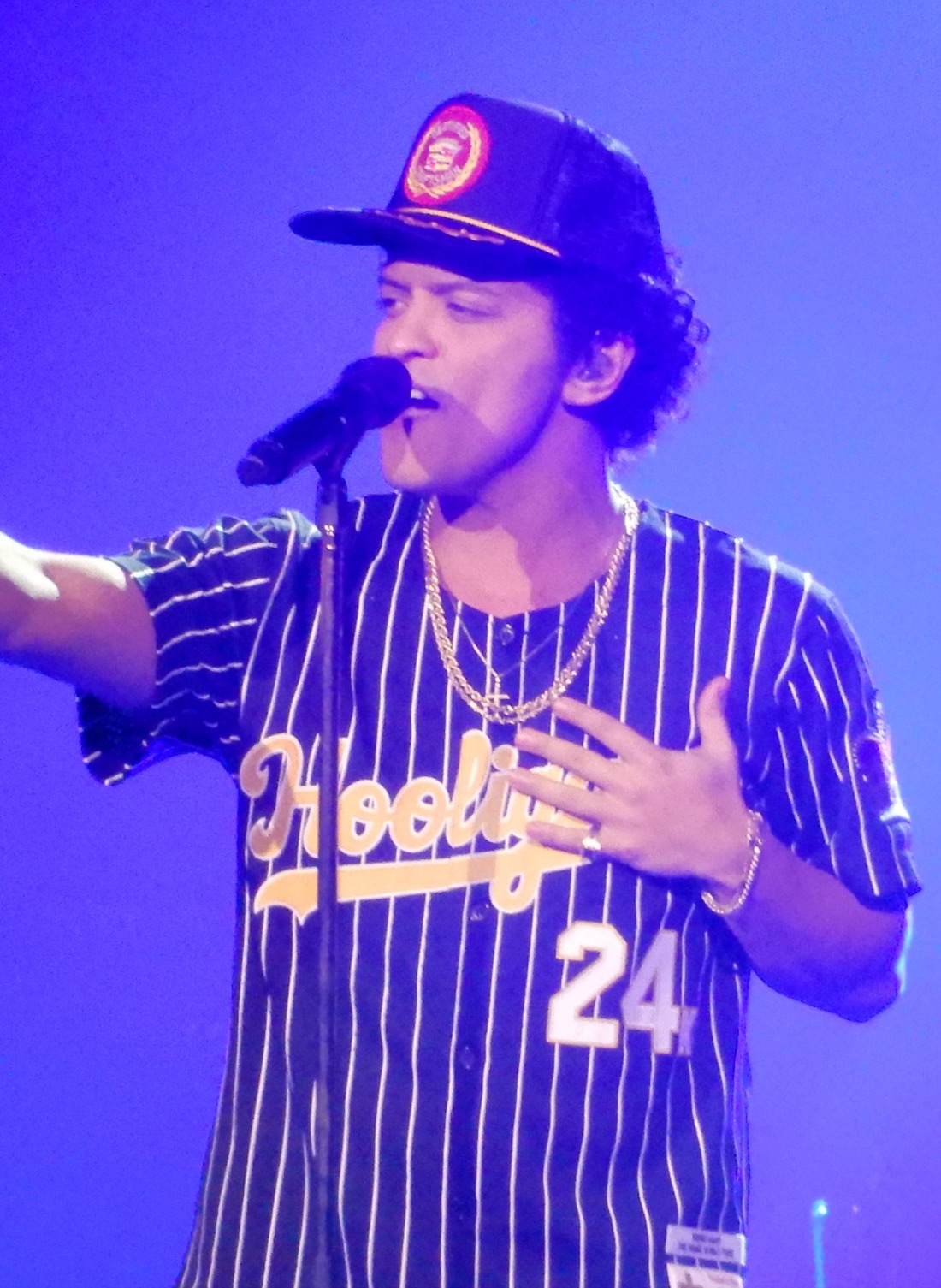
Rosé and Bruno Mars topped the chart for 10 weeks (nine in 2024) and the monthly chart for three months with their collaborative single "APT.".

†	Indicates best-performing single of 2024

List of number-one songs on the weekly Circle Digital Chart in 2024
Week ending date	Song	Artist(s)	Ref.
January 6	"Perfect Night"	Le Sserafim	
January 13	"Perfect Night"	Le Sserafim	
January 20	"Rhapsody of Sadness" (비의 랩소디)	Lim Jae-hyun	
January 27	"Love Wins All"	IU	
February 3	"Love Wins All"	IU	
February 10	"Love Wins All"	IU	
February 17	"Love Wins All"	IU	
February 24	"Bam Yang Gang" (밤양갱)	Bibi	
March 2	"Bam Yang Gang" (밤양갱)	Bibi	
March 9	"Bam Yang Gang" (밤양갱)	Bibi	
March 16	"Bam Yang Gang" (밤양갱)	Bibi	
March 23	"Fate" (나는 아픈 건 딱 질색이니까)	(G)I-dle	
March 30	"Fate" (나는 아픈 건 딱 질색이니까)	(G)I-dle	
April 6	"Fate" (나는 아픈 건 딱 질색이니까)	(G)I-dle	
April 13	"Magnetic"	Illit	
April 20	"Magnetic"	Illit	
April 27	"Magnetic"	Illit	
May 4	"Maestro"	Seventeen	
May 11	"Warmth" (온기)	Lim Young-woong	
May 18	"Spot!"	Zico featuring Jennie	
May 25	"Supernova" †	Aespa	
June 1	"Supernova" †	Aespa	
June 8	"Supernova" †	Aespa	
June 15	"Supernova" †	Aespa	
June 22	"Supernova" †	Aespa	
June 29	"Small Girl"	Lee Young-ji featuring D.O.	
July 6	"Small Girl"	Lee Young-ji featuring D.O.	
July 13	"Supernova" †	Aespa	
July 20	"Supernova" †	Aespa	
July 27	"Supernova" †	Aespa	
August 3	"Walk"	NCT 127	
August 10	"Supernova" †	Aespa	
August 17	"Supernova" †	Aespa	
August 24	"Pump Up the Volume!"	Plave	
August 31	"Supernova" †	Aespa	
September 7	"Melt Down" (녹아내려요)	Day6	
September 14	"Happy"	Day6	
September 21	"Happy"	Day6	
September 28	"Happy"	Day6	
October 5	"Happy"	Day6	
October 12	"Happy"	Day6	
October 19	"Love, Money, Fame"	Seventeen featuring DJ Khaled	
October 26	"APT."	Rosé and Bruno Mars	
November 2	"APT."	Rosé and Bruno Mars	
November 9	"APT."	Rosé and Bruno Mars	
November 16	"APT."	Rosé and Bruno Mars	
November 23	"APT."	Rosé and Bruno Mars	
November 30	"APT."	Rosé and Bruno Mars	
December 7	"Home Sweet Home"	G-Dragon featuring Taeyang and Daesung	
December 14	"APT."	Rosé and Bruno Mars	
December 21	"APT."	Rosé and Bruno Mars	
December 28	"APT."	Rosé and Bruno Mars	

== Monthly charts ==
List of number-one songs on the monthly Circle Digital Chart in 2024
Month	Song	Artist(s)	Ref.
January	"To. X"	Taeyeon	
February	"Love Wins All"	IU	
March	"Bam Yang Gang" (밤양갱)	Bibi	
April	"Magnetic"	Illit	
May	"Spot!"	Zico featuring Jennie	
June	"Supernova" †	Aespa	
July	"Supernova" †	Aespa	
August	"Supernova" †	Aespa	
September	"Happy"	Day6	
October	"APT."	Rosé and Bruno Mars	
November	"APT."	Rosé and Bruno Mars	
December	"APT."	Rosé and Bruno Mars	
