= I Love You (Taeyeon song) =

Single by Taeyeon

from the album Athena: Goddess of War OST
- A-side: "I Love You"
- B-side: "I Love You (Instrumental)"
- Released: December 13, 2010
- Recorded: 2010
- Length: 3:22
- Label: SM Entertainment
- Songwriter: Ahn Youngmin
- Producer: Lee Soo Man

Kim Taeyeon singles chronology
"Like a Star" (2010)	"I Love You" (2010)	"Different" (2011)

Music video
- "I Love You" MV on YouTube "I Love You" MV 2 on YouTube

"I Love You" (Korean: 사랑해요; RR: Salanghaeyo) is a ballad song recorded by South Korean singer Taeyeon as the main theme for the 2010 action-drama television series Athena: Goddess of War and the main title track for its soundtrack album. It was released as a digital single on December 13, 2010, under the record label of SM Entertainment.

== Production and background ==
"I was so shocked by Taeyeon's singing ability. It's a mature song so I was worried, but she made tears fall down my face. Barely an hour into production had passed, and I remember clapping my hands. It felt regrettable just then that this voice and emotion could be covered up by the title of 'idol' [star].

— Ahn Youngmin

"I Love You" was composed and written by Korean music producer Ahn Youngmin, who is known for producing many ballad songs for various K-pop artists including T-ara, Davichi and SeeYa among others. Taeyeon had collaborated with the producer before on her previous single "Like a Star" for which Ahn had provided the lyrics and singing advice. For "I Love You", Ahn composed, wrote the lyrics for, and arranged the song.

The song was used as the main theme song for the love-hate relationship between the lead characters Lee Jung-woo (portrayed by Jung Woo-sung) and Yoon Hye-in (Soo Ae) of the action-drama television series Athena: Goddess of War. According to South Korean music portal site Naver, the song is "a blend of Irish whistle and a 50-piece orchestra" and the lyrics describe the feelings of a woman trying to grab hold of her lover who is breaking up with her, confessing her deep love for him in the process.

== Release ==
"I Love You" debuted as the ending theme song for Athena: Goddess of War when the show started airing its run on SBS on December 13, 2010. On the same day, the song was released as an A-side and B-side single and made available for music download on various music portal sites such as iTunes, Naver, Soribada, Daum, Melon, Olleh, Bugs, Genie and Monkey3. The instrumental version was also included in the single. "I Love You" was the first song of the series' soundtrack to be unveiled and released for download. Later, the song was also included as the title track in the original soundtrack and score album of the series, released in physical CD format on February 11, 2011. All releases were marked under the record label of S.M. Entertainment.

Digital single
No.	Title	Lyrics	Music	Artist	Length
1.	"사랑해요 (I Love You)"	Ahn Youngmin	Ahn Youngmin	Kim Taeyeon	3:22
2.	"사랑해요 (I Love You)" (Instrumental)	—	Ahn Youngmin	Kim Taeyeon	3:22
Total length:					06:44

== Music videos ==
Two accompanying music videos for "I Love You" were released, though neither was filmed specifically for that purpose and contained only a compilation of various scenes from the television drama series Athena: Goddess of War. The first music video was released on December 10, 2010, three days prior to the release of the actual single and first broadcast of the series itself. It was uploaded on the official channel of S.M. Entertainment on YouTube and featured a summary outlook of the entire series that revolved around the tragic love and betrayal relationship between the two lead characters, Lee Jung-woo (portrayed by Jung Woo-sung) and Yoon Hye-in (portrayed by Soo Ae), and their eventual reconciliation. Due to the unexpected popularity that the series and the song itself enjoyed after debut, a second special music video, subtitled "Highlight of SBS 'ATHENA: Goddess of War'", was aired and uploaded on the same channel on December 16, 2010. The video featured various scenes from the series that revolved around the interactions between Lee Jung-woo and his co-worker Han Jae-hui (portrayed by Lee Ji-ah) as well as their confused feelings for each other.

== Charts ==
=== Weekly charts ===
Chart (2010)	Peak position
South Korea (Gaon)	2

=== Monthly charts ===
Chart (2010)	Position
South Korea (Gaon)	8

=== Year-end charts ===
Chart (2010)	Position
South Korea (Gaon)	170

== Live performances ==
Taeyeon performed "I Love You" live in front of a combined audience of around 50,000 during concerts at Saitama Super Arena in Tokyo and Osaka-Jo Hall in Osaka on January 5 and 9, 2011 respectively. The Japanese leg of the tour was aimed for the promotion of the television series in Japan which started airing in the country on November 30, 2010. Although her fellow Girls' Generation members were unable to attend due to busy schedules, her label-mates BoA, TVXQ, Super Junior and Shinee as well as the cast and crew of the series were present.

== Awards and nominations ==
Year	Award ceremony	Category	Result	Ref.
2011	Mnet Asian Music Awards	Best OST	Nominated	
2011	Mnet Asian Music Awards	Song of the Year	Longlisted	
2011	MelOn Music Awards	Best OST	Nominated	
