= Welcome to Samdal-ri =

2023–2024 South Korean television series

- Promotional poster
- Hangul: 웰컴투 삼달리
- Hanja: 웰컴투 三達里
- RR: Welkeomtu Samdal-ri
- MR: Welk'ŏmt'u Samdal-li
- Genre: Comedy drama; Romantic comedy
- Written by: Kwon Hye-joo
- Directed by: Cha Young-hoon
- Starring: Ji Chang-wook; Shin Hye-sun
- Music by: Gaemi
- Country of origin: South Korea
- Original language: Korean
- No. of episodes: 16

Production
- Executive producer: Park Seol-gi
- Producers: Jeon Seo-won; Lee Go-eun; Kim Su-ji; Kim Yu-ri; Jo Dong-min; Ha Seong-min
- Running time: 70 minutes
- Production companies: MI; SLL

Original release
- Network: JTBC
- Release: December 2, 2023 – January 21, 2024

Welcome to Samdal-ri (Korean: 웰컴투 삼달리) is a South Korean romantic comedy drama television series written by Kwon Hye-joo, directed by Cha Young-hoon, and starring Ji Chang-wook and Shin Hye-sun. It aired on JTBC on December 2, 2023 to January 21, 2024, every Saturday and Sunday at 22:30 (KST). It is also available for streaming on TVING in South Korea, and on Netflix in selected regions.

== Synopsis ==
Cho Yong-pil and Cho Sam-dal are childhood friends. After his mother, a member of the haenyeos, drowns because of a mistaken weather report, Yong-pil decides to become a weather forecaster to protect the elders of his Jeju Island hometown. However, his passion and refusal to let misinformation slide earns him a reputation as a stubborn troublemaker. On the other hand, Sam-dal moves to Seoul to pursue her dreams of becoming a successful fashion photographer, and goes by the name of Cho Eun-hye. But when her life suddenly falls apart, she returns to her hometown, where she reconnects with Yong-pil. Despite an incident that drove them apart, the two friends find their affection for each other still as strong as ever.

== Cast ==
=== Main ===
- Ji Chang-wook as Cho Yong-pil
  - Choi Seung-hoon as teen Yong-pil
  - Song Min-jae as young Yong-pil

A weather forecaster at Jeju Island's Meteorological Administration.

- Shin Hye-sun as Cho Sam-dal / Cho Eun-hye
  - Lee Joo-yeon as teen Sam-dal
  - Lee Seol-a as young Sam-dal

A photographer in the fashion industry under the stage name Cho Eun-hye.

=== Supporting ===
==== Sam-dal's family ====
- Kim Mi-kyung as Go Mi-ja
  - Chung Ye-jin as young Mi-ja

Sam-dal's mother who is a leader of haenyeo.

- Seo Hyun-chul as Cho Pan-sik
  - Lee Suk-hyeong as young Pan-sik

Sam-dal's father who is a bus driver on Jeju Island.

- Shin Dong-mi as Cho Jin-dal
  - Kim Ah-hyun as young Jin-dal

Sam-dal's older sister who is a former flight attendant.

- Kang Mi-na as Cho Hae-dal
  - Park Seol-ha as young Hae-dal

Sam-dal's younger sister.

- Kim Do-eun as Cha Ha-yul

Hae-dal's daughter.

==== Yong-pil's family ====
- Yu Oh-seong as Cho Sang-tae
  - Yoo Hee-je as young Sang-tae

Yong-pil's father who works as a contract worker in the civil affairs team.

- Jung Yoo-mi as Bu Mi-ja
  - Oh Woo-ri as young Mi-ja

Yong-pil's late mother.

==== Five Eagle Brothers ====
- Kang Young-seok as Boo Sang-do

Sam-dal and Yong-pil's best friend who is a symbol of wealth in the village. He has had a crush on Sam-dal for a long time.

- Lee Jae-won as Wang Kyung-tae

Sam-dal and Yong-pil's best friend who is a security guard at Jeju Island's Meteorological Administration.

- Bae Myung-jin as Cha Eun-woo

Sam-dal and Yong-pil's best friend who is an observer at Jeju Island's Meteorological Administration.

==== People around the three sisters ====
- Yang Kyung-won as Jeon Dae-young

Jin-dal's ex-husband and AS Group's CEO.

- Kang Gil-woo as Go Cheol-jong

Dae-yeong's secretary.

- Kim Min-chul as Gong Ji-chan

CEO of Dolphin Center, a Jeju southern bottlenose dolphin protection group.

==== People in Samdal-ri ====
- Baek Hyun-joo as Oh Geum-sul

Kyung-tae's mother who is a haenyeo.

- Kim Mi-hwa as Yang Bu-ja

Eun-woo's mother who is a haenyeo.

- Yoon Jin-seong as Jeon He-ja

Sang-do's mother who is a haenyeo and owner of the best restaurant in Jeju.

- Kim Ja-young as Yang Geum-ok

Yong-pil's maternal grandmother who suffer dementia.

- Yoo Sun-woong as Bu Dae-chun

Yong-pil's maternal grandfather.

- Kim Hak-sun as Boo Dae-song

Sang-do's father.

- Byun Jong-su as Wang Seong-gu

Kyung-tae's father.

- Yoo Seung-il as Cha Man-deok

Eun-woo's father.

- Sazal Mahamud as Kim Man-soo

A foreign part-timer at Kyung-tae's Lucky Convenience Store.

==== Jeju Island's Meteorological Administration ====
- Lee Tae-hyung as Han Seok-gyu

Yong-pil's superior who is a division manager of the forecast department.

- Kim Hyun-mok as Kang Baek-ho

Yong-pil's colleague who is a forecaster of the forecast department.

==== People around Cho Eun-hye ====
- Jo Yun-seo as Bang Eun-ju

3moon Studio's assistant and an amateur photographer who makes up a false claim against Sam-dal that ruins her career and causes her to move back to her hometown.

- Han Eun-seong as Cheon Chung-gi

Sam-dal's ex-boyfriend who is an editor of Magazine X.

- Kim Ah-young as Go Eun-bi

3moon Studio's assistants.

- Lee Do-hye as Yang Ji-eun

3moon Studio's assistants.

=== Special appearance ===
- Kim Tae-hee as Herself
- Kim Dae-gon as Reporter An Kang-hyun

== Production ==
=== Casting ===
On June 19, 2023, Ji Chang-wook and Shin Hye-sun were confirmed to appear in the series.

== Original soundtrack ==
=== Soundtrack album ===
Welcome to Samdal-ri (Original Television Soundtrack) SPECIAL

Soundtrack album by Various Artists
- Released: February 2, 2024
- Label: MOST Contents

The series' soundtrack album was released on February 2, 2024.

Disc 1
No.	Title	Artist	Length
1.	"Short Hair" (단발머리)	DK (Seventeen)	3:41
2.	"Beautiful Day"	Gemini	4:09
3.	"Dream" (꿈)	Taeyeon	3:58
4.	"Reunion" (추억속의 재회)	Shin Seung-hun	4:17
5.	"In My Heart" (그대 내 맘에)	Bumjin	3:30
6.	"Good Person" (좋은 사람)	Kim Na-young	3:34
7.	"Song of the Sea" (바다의 노래)	LeeZe	3:57
8.	"Dance" (춤)	Dori	2:49
Total length:			60:49

Disc 2
No.	Title	Artist	Length
1.	"Welcome to Samdalri"	Gaemi & Shoon	1:41
2.	"Lonely Samdal"	Park Jong-mi	2:34
3.	"I Believe"	Lee Seong-gu	2:43
4.	"Western Jeju"	Jeon Chan-woong	2:19
5.	"You and I"	Lee Joon-hwa	2:53
6.	"I Love You"	Gaemi	2:44
7.	"Bright Whistle"	Gaemi & Hong Dong-pyo	1:21
8.	"What's Going On"	Park Mi-sun	2:08
9.	"Unexpected Reunions"	Hong Dong-pyo	1:54
10.	"At Sea"	Gaemi	3:40
11.	"Seaside"	Lee Joon-hwa	4:14
12.	"Samdal and Yongpil"	Park Mi-sun	1:52
13.	"Haedal and Jichan"	Park Jung-hwan	1:51
14.	"A Grown-Up Child"	Jeon Chan-woong	3:12
15.	"Treasure"	Park Mi-sun	2:36
16.	"Sisters"	Lee Seong-gu	2:21
17.	"Crisis"	Park Yoon-seo	3:01
18.	"You're Not Alone"	Park Yoon-seo	3:22
19.	"Bubble"	Lee Seong-gu	2:16
20.	"Return"	Lee Joon-hwa	2:54
21.	"Kholrabi Kimchi"	Hong Dong-pyo	1:37
22.	"The Way of the Waves"	Park Jung-hwan	2:41
23.	"Waltz of Samdal-ri"	Park Jong-mi & Kang Myung-su	2:28
24.	"Three Sisters"	Shoon	2:19
25.	"First Time"	Sayaka Aoki	2:28
26.	"Our Time Together"	Park Yoon-seo	3:05
27.	"Samdal is Here?"	Jeon Chan-woong	2:02
28.	"Lock the Door!"	Park Jung-hwan	2:05
29.	"Love After Farewell"	Park Jong-mi & Kang Myung-su	3:02
30.	"Embarrassing"	Shoon	2:45
31.	"The Moment of Someone Falls in Love"	Shoon	3:02

=== Welcome to Samdal-ri From CHO YONG PIL (2024 Remastering) ===
Released on January 20, 2024
No.	Title	Artist	Length
1.	"Dream" (꿈)	Cho Yong-pil	4:45
2.	"Reunion" (추억속의 재회)	Cho Yong-pil	4:40
3.	"Mona Lisa" (모나리자)	Cho Yong-pil	4:05
4.	"Spinning Life" (돌고 도는 인생)	Cho Yong-pil	3:20
5.	"MADOYO" (마도요)	Cho Yong-pil	3:14
Total length:			20:04

=== Singles ===
Original Soundtrack Parts 1–8

Part 1 (Released on December 3, 2023)
No.	Title	Artist	Length
1.	"Short Hair" (단발머리)	DK (Seventeen)	3:41
2.	"Short Hair" (단발머리; Inst.)		3:41
Total length:			7:22

Part 2 (Released on December 10, 2023)
No.	Title	Artist	Length
1.	"Beautiful Day"	Gemini	4:09
2.	"Beautiful Day" (Inst.)		4:09
Total length:			8:18

Part 3 (Released on December 17, 2023)
No.	Title	Artist	Length
1.	"Dream" (꿈)	Taeyeon	3:58
2.	"Dream" (꿈; Inst.)		3:58
Total length:			7:56

Part 4 (Released on December 24, 2023)
No.	Title	Artist	Length
1.	"Reunion" (추억속의 재회)	Shin Seung-hun	4:17
2.	"Reunion" (추억속의 재회; Inst.)		4:17
Total length:			8:34

Part 5 (Released on December 30, 2023)
No.	Title	Artist	Length
1.	"In My Heart" (그대 내 맘에)	Bumjin	3:30
2.	"In My Heart" (그대 내 맘에; Inst.)		3:30
Total length:			7:00

Part 6 (Released on January 7, 2024)
No.	Title	Artist	Length
1.	"Good Person" (좋은 사람)	Kim Na-young	3:34
2.	"Good Person" (좋은 사람; Inst.)		3:34
Total length:			7:08

Part 7 (Released on January 13, 2024)
No.	Title	Artist	Length
1.	"Song of the Sea" (바다의 노래)	LeeZe	3:57
2.	"Song of the Sea" (바다의 노래; Inst.)		3:57
Total length:			7:54

Part 8 (Released on January 14, 2024)
No.	Title	Artist	Length
1.	"Dance" (춤)	Dori	2:49
2.	"Dance" (춤; Inst.)		2:49
Total length:			5:38

== Reception ==
=== Viewership ===
Welcome to Samdal-ri : South Korea viewers per episode (millions)

Season	Episode number															
Season	1	2	3	4	5	6	7	8	9	10	11	12	13	14	15	16
1	1.205	1.262	1.169	1.522	1.597	N/A	N/A	N/A	N/A	N/A	1.666	2.251	2.138	2.398	2.583	2.965

Source: Audience measurement performed nationwide by Nielsen Korea.

Average TV viewership ratings
Ep.	Original broadcast date	Average audience share (Nielsen Korea)	
Ep.	Original broadcast date	Nationwide	Seoul
1	December 2, 2023	5.193% (1st)	5.283% (1st)
2	December 3, 2023	5.276% (1st)	5.552% (1st)
3	December 9, 2023	5.324% (1st)	6.329% (1st)
4	December 10, 2023	6.509% (1st)	7.255% (1st)
5	December 16, 2023	6.689% (1st)	6.528% (1st)
6	December 17, 2023	8.295% (1st)	9.2%
7	December 23, 2023	6.382% (1st)	6.6%
8	December 24, 2023	7.913% (1st)	7.9%
9	December 30, 2023	8.109% (1st)	8.8%
10	December 31, 2023	8.227% (1st)	8.7%
11	January 6, 2024	7.282% (2nd)	8.037% (1st)
12	January 7, 2024	9.788% (1st)	10.597% (1st)
13	January 13, 2024	9.324% (1st)	10.389% (1st)
14	January 14, 2024	10.068% (1st)	10.790% (1st)
15	January 20, 2024	10.365% (1st)	10.919% (1st)
16	January 21, 2024	12.399% (1st)	13.081% (1st)
Average		7.946%	8.498%
In the table above, the blue numbers represent the lowest ratings and the red numbers represent the highest ratings.; This series aired on a cable channel/pay TV which normally has a relatively smaller audience compared to free-to-air TV/public broadcasters (KBS, SBS, MBC, and EBS).

=== Accolades ===
==== Awards and nominations ====
Name of the award ceremony, year presented, category, nominee of the award, and the result of the nomination
Award ceremony	Year	Category	Nominee / Work	Result	Ref.
Baeksang Arts Awards	2024	Best Supporting Actress	Shin Dong-mi	Nominated	
Korean Drama Festival	2024	Best OST	"Dream" (Taeyeon)	Nominated	
Korea Grand Music Awards	2024	Best OST	"Dream" (Taeyeon)	Nominated	
MAMA Awards	2024	Best OST	"Dream" (Taeyeon)	Nominated	
MAMA Awards	2024	Song of the Year	"Dream" (Taeyeon)	Nominated	
Melon Music Awards	2024	Best OST	"Dream" (Taeyeon)	Nominated	
APAN Star Awards	2024	Best OST	"Dream" (Taeyeon)	Nominated	
APAN Star Awards	2024	Top Excellence Award, Actor in a Miniseries	Ji Chang-wook	Won	
APAN Star Awards	2024	Excellence Acting Award, Actor	Seo Hyun-chul	Nominated	
APAN Star Awards	2024	Best New Actress	Kang Mi-na	Won	
APAN Star Awards	2024	Best Child Actress	Kim Do-eun	Nominated	
APAN Star Awards	2024	Popularity Star Award, Actress	Shin Hye-sun	Nominated	

==== Listicles ====
Name of publisher, year listed, name of listicle, and placement
Publisher	Year	Listicle	Placement	Ref.
South China Morning Post	2024	The 15 best K-dramas of 2024	5th place	
