= Dream (Taeyeon song) =

Single by Taeyeon

from the album Welcome to Samdal-ri OST Special
- Released: December 17, 2023
- Recorded: 2023
- Studio: SM Droplet (Seoul); Seoul
- Length: 3:58
- Label: Most Contents; NHN Bugs
- Songwriter: Cho Yong-pil
- Producers: Lee Joo-hyung; Kwon Ji-yoon

Taeyeon singles chronology
"To. X" (2023)	"Dream" (2023)	"Heaven" (2024)

Music video
- "Dream" MV on YouTube

"Dream" (Korean: 꿈; RR: Kkum) is a remake song recorded by South Korean singer Taeyeon for the soundtrack of the 2023 drama series Welcome to Samdal-ri. The song is a remake version of "The Dreams", originally released as the title track of Cho Yong-pil's 13th studio album of the same name on April 20, 1991. It was originally written by Cho Yong-pil, with further arrangement in the remake version by Lee Joo-hyung of MonoTree and Kwon Ji-yoon. It was re-recorded and released as a digital single on December 17, 2023, by Most Contents, under license by NHN Bugs.

== Background and composition ==
On November 30, 2023, Most Contents confirmed that Taeyeon would be named in the first lineup to record the soundtrack for the drama series Welcome to Samdal-ri. "Dream" was selected to be remade by the original singer Cho Yong-pil, which was the previous title track of his 13th studio album The Dreams, released in 1991. The song reminds us of the characters Five Eagle Brothers who came to Seoul from their hometown in Jeju Island with brilliant dreams, especially highlighting the intense three-month journey they undertook in pursuit of those dreams. The song was released on December 17, 2023, its music video was released on the same day.

The remake version of "Dream" reinterpreted with bright, medium-tempo, rhythmic band arrangements, aims to accentuate the beauty of the original song's lyrics and melodies with Taeyeon's clear and powerful vocals. The song also marks 15 years of recording collaboration between Taeyeon and composer Lee Joo-hyung since "Baby Baby" (2008). The song was composed in the key of E major, with a tempo of 112 beats per minute.

== Commercial performance ==
"Dream" debuted at number 95 on South Korea's Circle Digital Chart in the chart issue dated December 17–23, 2023; on its component charts, the song debuted at number six on the Circle Download Chart, number 175 on the Circle Streaming Chart, number two on both the Circle BGM Chart and Circle V Coloring Chart, and number one on both the Circle Bell Chart and Circle Ring Chart. The song gained traction on the video-sharing service Instagram Reels, with its audio soundtracking over 370,000 videos on the platform. The surge in popularity online fueled the song's performance, it ascended to number 18 on the Circle Digital Chart in the chart issue dated February 11–17, 2024; on its component charts, it rose to a new peak of number 20 on the Circle Streaming Chart in the same week and reached the top position on Circle V Coloring Chart in the first week of tracking in 2024. The song also topped the Circle Ring and Bell charts for 9 consecutive weeks and 10 consecutive weeks, respectively.

== Track listing ==
Digital download / streaming
No.	Title	Lyrics	Music	Arrangement	Length
1.	"Dream" (꿈)	Cho Yong-pil	Cho Yong-pil	Lee Joo-hyung; Kwon Ji-yoon	3:58
2.	"Dream" (Inst.)		Cho Yong-pil	Lee Joo-hyung; Kwon Ji-yoon	3:58
Total length:					7:56

== Accolades ==
Awards and nominations for "Dream"
Award ceremony	Year	Category	Result	Ref.
APAN Star Awards	2024	Best OST	Nominated	
Korean Drama Festival	2024	Best OST	Nominated	
Korea Grand Music Awards	2024	Best OST	Nominated	
MAMA Awards	2024	Best OST	Nominated	
MAMA Awards	2024	Song of the Year	Nominated	
Melon Music Awards	2024	Best OST	Nominated	

== Credits and personnel ==
Credits adapted from Melon.

Studio

- SM Droplet Studio – recording
- Seoul Studio – recording
- MonoTree Studio – digital editing
- GLAB Studios – engineered for mix, mixing
- 821 Sound – mastering

Personnel

- Taeyeon – vocals
- Cho Yong-pil – lyrics, composition
- Lee Joo-hyung – producer, arrangement, vocal directing, digital editing
- Kwon Ji-yoon – producer, arrangement, keyboard
- Lee Jung-hoon – drums
- Woo Hyun-ha – bass
- Jo Chang-hyun – guitar
- Yung String – strings
- Nile Lee – strings conducting, strings arrangement
- Kim Joo-hyun – recording
- Jeong Ki-hong – recording
- Lee Chan-mi – recording assistant
- Park Nam-joon – engineered for mix
- Shin Bong-won – mixing
- Kwon Nam-woo – mastering

== Charts ==
=== Weekly charts ===
Weekly chart performance for "Dream"
Chart (2024)	Peak position
South Korea (Circle)	18

=== Monthly charts ===
Monthly chart performance for "Dream"
Chart (2024)	Position
South Korea (Circle)	18

=== Year-end charts ===
Year-end chart performance for "Dream"
Chart (2024)	Position
South Korea (Circle)	62

== Release history ==
Release dates and formats for "Dream"
Region	Date	Format	Label	Ref.
Various	December 17, 2023	Digital download; streaming	Most Contents; NHN Bugs	
