= Something New (Taeyeon song) =

Single by Taeyeon

from the EP Something New
- Released: June 18, 2018
- Genre: Urban pop; neo soul
- Length: 3:20
- Label: SM
- Composers: Dem Jointz; Macy Maloy; Ryan S. Jhun
- Lyricist: Ji Yu Ri

Taeyeon singles chronology
"This Christmas" (2017)	"Something New" (2018)	"Stay" (2018)

Music video
- "Something New" on YouTube

"Something New" is a song recorded by South Korean singer Taeyeon. It was released on June 18, 2018, by SM Entertainment. It is the title track of Taeyeon's third EP with the same name Something New.

== Reception ==
"Something New" debuted at number fifteen on South Korea's Gaon Digital Chart for the chart issue dated June 17–23, 2018. It additionally peaked at number 24 on the Billboard World Digital Songs chart.

== Music video ==
On June 14, 2018, the music video teaser for the title track "Something New" was released and has attracted attention for its cinematography.

== Charts ==
Chart	Peak position
South Korea (Gaon)	15
South Korea (K-pop Hot 100)	15
US World Digital Songs (Billboard)	24

== Release history ==
Region	Date	Format	Label
Worldwide	June 18, 2018	Digital download, streaming	SM Entertainment

== Credits ==
Credits adapted from album's liner notes.

Studio

- SM Booming System – recording, engineered for mix, mixing
- SM Big Shot Studio – recording, digital editing
- Sonic Korea – mastering

Personnel

- SM Entertainment – executive producer
- Lee Soo-man – producer
- Taeyeon – vocals, background vocals
- Ji Yu-ri – lyrics
- Dem Jointz – composition, arrangement
- Macy Maloy – composition
- Ryan S. Jhun – composition
- Yoo Young-jin – arrangement, recording, engineered for mix, mixing, music and sound supervisor
- Lee Ju-hyung – vocal directing
- Kang Tae-woo a.k.a. Soulman – background vocals
- Yang Geun-young – background vocals
- Lee Min-kyu – recording, digital editing
- Jeon Hoon – mastering
- Shin Soo-min – mastering assistant
