= This Christmas (Taeyeon song) =

Single by Taeyeon

from the EP This Christmas: Winter Is Coming
- Released: December 12, 2017
- Genre: Ballad
- Length: 4:27
- Label: SM
- Songwriters: Score (13); Megatone (13)
- Producer: 13

Taeyeon singles chronology
"Make Me Love You" (2017)	"This Christmas" (2017)	"Something New" (2018)

Music video
- "This Christmas" on YouTube

"This Christmas" is a song recorded by South Korean singer Taeyeon. It was released as a digital single on December 12, 2017, by SM Entertainment. It is the title track of Taeyeon's special Christmas album This Christmas: Winter Is Coming.

== Background and release ==
The music video for "This Christmas" was released on December 12, 2017. The song is an authentic ballad featuring a magnificent orchestral sound and the delicate and explosive singing ability of 'Taeyeon' and an instrumental version is also included. The younger version of Taeyeon in the video is played by Kim Jiwon, who made her debut as Liz of IVE in 2021, but was not a trainee at the time. To promote the album, Taeyeon held a two-night concert titled "The Magic of Christmas Time" on December 22 and 23, 2017 at Kyung Hee University, Seoul.

== Chart performance ==
"This Christmas" debuted at number 2 on the South Korean Gaon Digital Chart. On the Billboard K-Pop Hot 100 Chart, the song debuted at number five in the chart issue dated December 30, 2017.

== Charts ==
Chart (2017)	Peak position
South Korea (Gaon)	2
South Korea (K-pop Hot 100)	5

== Sales ==
Region	Sales
South Korea	227,856

== Credits ==
Credits adapted from the EP's liner notes.

Studio

- SM Big Shot Studio – recording, digital editing
- SM LVYIN Studio – recording
- Seoul Studio – recording
- SM Blue Ocean Studio – mixing
- 821 Sound – mastering

Personnel

- SM Entertainment – executive producer
- Lee Soo-man – producer
- Yoo Young-jin – music and sound supervisor
- Taeyeon – vocals
- Score (13) – producer, songwriter, vocal directing, piano
- Megatone (13) – producer, songwriter, vocal directing, bass
- Jukjae – guitar
- Kim Eun-seok – drums
- Yung – strings
- Park Oh-dal – strings conducting, strings arrangement
- Lee Min-kyu – recording, digital editing
- Lee Ji-hong – recording
- Jeong Ki-hong – recording
- Choi Da-in – recording
- Ji Yong-joo – recording
- Kim Cheol-sun – mixing
- Kwon Nam-woo – mastering

== Release history ==
Region	Date	Format	Label
Worldwide	December 12, 2017	Digital download	SM Entertainment

== Awards and nominations ==
Year	Awards	Category	Recipient	Result
2018	Gaon Chart K-Pop Awards	Song of the Year – December	"This Christmas"	Nominated
