= Something New (EP) =

EP by Taeyeon
- Released: June 18, 2018
- Genres: Pop; R&B; neo soul
- Length: 20:53
- Language: Korean
- Label: SM
- Producer: Lee Soo-man (exec.)

Taeyeon chronology
| This Christmas: Winter Is Coming (2017) | Something New (2018) | Voice (2019) |

Singles from Something New
- 1. "Something New" Released: June 18, 2018

Music video
- "Something New" on YouTube

Something New is the third extended play and the fourth overall by South Korean singer Taeyeon. The album was released on June 18, 2018, by SM Entertainment and consists of six tracks including the title track of the same name, "Something New".

== Background and release ==
On June 12, 2018, SM Entertainment announced that Taeyeon's third EP would be released on June 18, 2018. This will mark Taeyeon's first EP released after her last album This Christmas: Winter Is Coming, released in December 2017. On June 14, 2018, the music video teaser for the title track "Something New" was released and has attracted attention for its cinematography.

== Track listing ==
Credits adapted from Naver

CD
| No. | Title | Lyrics | Music | Arrangement | Length |
|---|---|---|---|---|---|
| 1. | "Something New" | Ji Yu-ri | Dem Jointz; Macy Maloy; Ryan S. Jhun | Dem Jointz; Yoo Young-jin | 3:20 |
| 2. | "All Night Long" (저녁의 이유; Jeonyeogui iyu; 'Reason for the Evening') (featuring Lucas of NCT) | Kenzie | Kenzie; Michael Woods (Rice n' Peas); Kevin White (Rice n' Peas); MZMC; Yinette Claudette Mendez | Rice n' Peas | 3:42 |
| 3. | "바람 바람 바람" (Baram X 3) | Jo Yoon-kyung | Karen Poole; Sonny J. Mason; Emily Warren | Sonny J. Mason | 3:28 |
| 4. | "One Day" (너의 생일; Neoui saengil; 'Your Birthday') | Jo Yoon-kyung | Mike Woods (Rice n' Peas); Kevin White (Rice n' Peas); MZMC; Andrew Bazzi (Rice n' Peas & The Heavy Group); Kiana Brown (The Heavy Group); Yinette Claudette Mendez | Rice n' Peas | 3:30 |
| 5. | "Circus" | Jo Yoon-kyung | Denniz Jamm; Allison Kaplan; Le'mon (Joombas) | Denniz Jamm | 3:54 |
| 6. | "Something New" (Instrumental) | | Dem Jointz; Macy Maloy; Ryan S. Jhun | Dem Jointz; Yoo Young-jin | 2:59 |
| Total length: | | | | | 20:53 |

== Charts ==
=== Weekly ===
| Chart (2018) | Peak position |
|---|---|
| South Korean Albums (Gaon) | 3 |

=== Monthly charts ===
| Chart (2018) | Position |
|---|---|
| South Korean Albums (Gaon) | 8 |

=== Year-end charts ===
| Chart (2019) | Position |
|---|---|
| South Korean Albums (Gaon) | 63 |

== Release history ==
| Region | Date | Format | Label | Ref. |
|---|---|---|---|---|
| South Korea | June 18, 2018 | CD; digital download | SM Entertainment | |
| Various | June 18, 2018 | Digital download | SM Entertainment | |
