= GirlsSpkOut =

- Regular and digital cover

EP by Taeyeon
- Released: November 18, 2020
- Genre: J-pop
- Length: 17:56
- Language: Japanese
- Labels: SM Japan; EMI
- Producer: Lee Soo-man (exec.)

Taeyeon chronology
Purpose (2019)	GirlsSpkOut (2020)	What Do I Call You (2020)

Singles from GirlsSpkOut
- 1. "I Do" Released: December 1, 2019; 2. "#GirlsSpkOut" Released: November 18, 2020

#GirlsSpkOut is the second Japanese extended play and the sixth overall by South Korean singer Taeyeon. It was released digitally on October 30, 2020, by SM Entertainment Japan, and physically on November 18 by Universal Music Japan sublabel EMI Records.

== Background and release ==
On September 11, 2020, it was announced that Taeyeon would release her second Japanese EP in November. The album includes the title track "#GirlsSpkOut" for a total of five tracks. It was released in four editions: First limited edition (CD+DVD/photobook); first limited edition with limited edition goods (CD+DVD/photobook/goods); regular edition with limited edition goods (CD/goods) and the normal CD.

The music video for "#GirlsSpkOut" was released on October 1, 2020, and the EP was released digitally on October 30, 2020.

== Composition ==
The EP consists of five tracks, of which is filled with Taeyeon's unique "#GirlsSpkOut" message, emphasizing that while there may be conflicts and sadness in everyday life, the essence lies in holding hands and facing tomorrow together. The title track "#GirlsSpkOut" marks Taeyeon's first venture into a dance tune, produced based on her message of expressing one's thoughts and showing one's true self, believing it will inevitably bring positive influences to one's life. "Worry Free Love" is a futuristic tune anticipating upcoming trends. The EP also included "Be Real", a number that epitomizes the current global era with its fusion of R&B and Latin elements. Furthermore, "I Do" is a mid-tempo and mellow tune imbued with Asian flavors, which interestingly serves as a message song from Taeyeon to her Japanese fans, fitting well with the autumn atmosphere. Finally, the EP concludes with "Sorrow", a grandiose piece delivered solely through Taeyeon's vocals and piano, showcasing her utmost charm.

== Track listing ==
GirlsSpkOut track listing
No.	Title	Lyrics	Music	Arrangement	Length
1.	"#GirlsSpkOut" (featuring Chanmina)	eill; Chanmina	Megan Lee; Shawn Halim; Adien Lewis (WayBetta); Willie Weeks	Megan Lee; Shawn Halim; Adien Lewis (WayBetta); Willie Weeks	3:31
2.	"Worry Free Love"	MEG.ME	Andreas Carlsson; Melanie Joy Fontana; Michel "Lindgren" Schulz	Andreas Carlsson; Melanie Joy Fontana; Michel "Lindgren" Schulz	3:28
3.	"Be Real"	BOYHOOD (Digz Inc.)	Joe Lawrence	Joe Lawrence	3:39
4.	"I Do"	MEG.ME	Celine Helgemo; Sebastian Aasen; Per Kristian Ottestad; Sheila Simmenes	Celine Helgemo; Sebastian Aasen; Per Kristian Ottestad; Sheila Simmenes	3:53
5.	"Sorrow"	Sara Sakurai (T's Music)	minGtion (ADC Music); EJAE	minGtion (ADC Music); EJAE	3:25
Total length:					17:56

GirlsSpkOut DVD track listing
No.	Title	Length
1.	"#GirlsSpkOut" (Music Video & Visual Makings)

== Charts ==
Chart performance for GirlsSpkOut
Chart (2020)	Peak position
Japanese Albums (Oricon)	9

== Release history ==
Release history for GirlsSpkOut
Region	Date	Format	Label	Ref.
Various	October 30, 2020	Digital download, streaming	SM Japan	
Japan	November 18, 2020	CD, CD+DVD	EMI	
