= To. X (song) =

- Remixes cover

Single by Taeyeon

from the EP To. X
- Language: Korean
- Released: November 27, 2023
- Studio: SM Starlight (Seoul)
- Genre: R&B
- Length: 2:50
- Label: SM; Kakao
- Composers: Stephen Puth; Dazy; Kristin Carpenter
- Lyricist: Kenzie

Taeyeon singles chronology
"Night Into Days" (2023)	"To. X" (2023)	"Dream" (2023)

Music video
- "To. X" on YouTube

"To. X" is a song recorded by South Korean singer Taeyeon for her fifth Korean extended play of the same name. It was released as the EP's lead single by SM Entertainment on November 27, 2023.

== Background and release ==
On November 6, 2023, SM Entertainment announced Taeyeon would be releasing her fifth Korean extended play titled To. X on November 27. On November 24, the music video teaser video was released. The song was released alongside its music video and the extended play on November 27. The remixes of "To. X" by Imlay and Hunjiya, and "Fabulous" by Ginjo, titled iScreaM Vol. 30: To. X Remixes, was released on March 8, 2024.

== Composition ==
"To. X" was written by Kenzie, composed by Stephen Puth, Dazy, and Kristin Carpenter, and arranged by Puth and Dazy. Described as a R&B song that "combines sensuous guitar riffs and rhythmic melodies" with lyrics carrying the message of "[Taeyeon singing] about the end of a controlling relationship after realizing that the other person is controlling her". "To. X" was composed in the key of A-flat major, with a tempo of 97 beats per minute.

== Commercial performance ==
Professional ratings
Review scores
Source	Rating
Music Y	3.5/5 stars

"To. X" debuted at number three on South Korea's Circle Digital Chart in the chart issue dated November 26 – December 2, 2023; on its component charts, the song debuted at number two on the Circle Download Chart, number six on the Circle Streaming Chart, and number 18 on the Circle BGM Chart. It ascended to number three on the Circle Streaming Chart in the following week. It rose to a new peak of number one on the Circle Streaming Chart in the chart issue dated January 21–27, 2024. The song reached number two on the Circle Digital Chart in the chart issue dated December 31, 2023 – January 6, 2024. It was also the best-performing single of January 2024 on the Circle Digital Chart. The song spent a total of 20 consecutive weeks in the top 10 of Circle Digital Chart, surpassed "Weekend" to become Taeyeon's longest-running top-10 hit. On the Billboard South Korea Songs, the song debuted at number six in the chart issue dated December 16, 2023. It ascended to number three on the Billboard South Korea Songs issue dated February 3, 2024.

On the Billboard Vietnam Hot 100, the song debuted at number 93 in the chart issue dated December 9, 2023. In Taiwan, the song debuted at number 22 on the Billboard Taiwan Songs in the chart issue dated December 16, 2023. It ascended to number 19 on the Billboard Taiwan Songs in the chart issue dated March 30, 2024. The song reached a new peak of number 13 on the Billboard Taiwan Songs in the chart issue dated April 13, 2024. Globally, the song debuted at number 187 on the Billboard Global Excl. U.S. in the chart issue dated December 16, 2023. The song reached number 148 on the Billboard Global Excl. U.S. in the chart issue dated January 20, 2024. After moving to number 148, it reached number 103 on the Billboard Global Excl. U.S. on the issue dated February 10, 2024.

== Promotion ==
Prior to the release of To. X, on November 27, 2023, Taeyeon held a live event called "Taeyeon 'To. X' Countdown Live" on YouTube, TikTok, Weverse, and Idol Plus, aimed at introducing the extended play and connecting with her fanbase. On December 8, 2023, a live performance clip of "To. X" was released on her YouTube channel. Taeyeon first performed "To. X" live in front of a total of 100,000 audiences at Tokyo Dome during concerts SM Town Live 2024: SMCU Palace in Tokyo on February 21 and 22, 2024.

== Accolades ==
Awards and nominations
Award ceremony	Year	Category	Result	Ref.
Golden Disc Awards	2025	Digital Bonsang (Best Digital Song)	Won	
Golden Disc Awards	2025	Digital Daesang (Song of the Year)	Nominated	
Korea Grand Music Awards	2024	Best Songs 10	Nominated	
MAMA Awards	2024	Best Vocal Performance – Solo	Nominated	
MAMA Awards	2024	Song of the Year	Nominated	
Melon Music Awards	2024	Song of the Year	Nominated	

Music program awards
Title	Date	Ref.
Inkigayo	December 10, 2023	
Show! Music Core	January 13, 2024	
Show! Music Core	January 20, 2024	
Show! Music Core	January 27, 2024	

Melon weekly popularity award
Award	Date	Ref.
Weekly Popularity Award	December 11, 2023	
Weekly Popularity Award	December 18, 2023	
Weekly Popularity Award	January 1, 2024	

== Track listing ==
- Digital download / streaming – iScreaM Vol. 30: To. X Remixes
1. "To. X" (Imlay remix) – 3:10
2. "To. X" (Hunjiya remix) – 2:32
3. "Fabulous" (Ginjo remix; bonus track) – 4:44
4. "To. X" – 2:50

== Credits and personnel ==
Credits adapted from album's liner notes.

Studio

- SM Starlight Studio – recording, digital editing
- SM Blue Ocean Studio – mixing
- 821 Sound – mastering

Personnel

- SM Entertainment – executive producer
- Taeyeon – vocals, background vocals
- Kenzie – lyrics, vocal directing
- Stephen Puth – composition, arrangement
- Dazy – composition, arrangement
- Kristin Carpenter – composition
- Jeong Yoo-ra – recording, digital editing
- Kim Cheol-sun – mixing
- Kwon Nam-woo – mastering

== Charts ==
=== Weekly charts ===
Weekly chart performance
Chart (2023–2024)	Peak position
Global Excl. U.S. (Billboard)	103
South Korea (Circle)	2
South Korea (Billboard)	3
Taiwan (Billboard)	13
Vietnam (Vietnam Hot 100)	93

=== Monthly charts ===
Monthly chart performance
Chart (2024)	Position
South Korea (Circle)	1

=== Year-end charts ===
Year-end chart performance for "To. X"
Chart	Year	Position
South Korea (Circle)	2024	10
South Korea (Circle)	2025	109

== Certifications ==
Region	Certification	Certified units/sales
Streaming
South Korea (KMCA)	Platinum	100,000,000^{†}
^{†} Streaming-only figures based on certification alone.

== Release history ==
Release history
Region	Date	Format	Label
Various	November 27, 2023	Digital download; streaming	SM; Kakao
Various	March 8, 2024	Digital download; streaming	SM; ScreaM; Kakao

== See also ==
- List of Inkigayo Chart winners (2023)
- List of Show! Music Core Chart winners (2024)
- List of number-one songs on the monthly Circle Digital Chart in 2024
