= Letter to Myself (song) =

Single by Taeyeon

from the EP Letter to Myself
- Language: Korean
- Released: November 18, 2024
- Genre: Pop rock
- Length: 3:04
- Label: SM; Kakao
- Composers: Dino Medanhodzic; Johanna Jansson; Rena Lovelis; Nia Lovelis; Casey Moreta
- Lyricist: Ha Yoo-na (153/Joombas)

Taeyeon singles chronology
"Heaven" (2024)	"Letter to Myself" (2024)	"Panorama" (2025)

Music video
- "Letter to Myself" on YouTube

"Letter to Myself" is a song recorded by South Korean singer Taeyeon for her sixth extended play of the same name. It was released as the EP's lead single by SM Entertainment on November 18, 2024.

== Background and release ==
On October 27, 2024, SM Entertainment announced that Taeyeon would be releasing her sixth extended play titled Letter to Myself with the lead single of the same name on November 18. The music video teasers were released on November 14 and 15. The song was released alongside the extended play and its music video on November 18.

During the live event for Letter to Myself on November 18, the singer revealed that there were "split opinions" regarding the choice of the title track for her EP. While everyone in her company advocated for "Disaster", she was the only one who insisted on selecting "Letter to Myself".

== Composition ==
"Letter to Myself" was written by Ha Yoo-na from 153/Joombas, and composed and arranged by Dino Medanhodzic alongside Johanna Jansson, Rena Lovelis, Nia Lovelis, and Casey Moreta. It was described as a pop rock song featuring "melodic guitar rhythm" with lyrics narrating "an honest letter conveying [Taeyeon's] present self to her past self with the awkward but solid words of comfort that was buried in her heart".

== Promotion ==
Prior to the release of Letter to Myself, on November 18, 2024, Taeyeon held a live event called "Taeyeon 'Letter to Myself' Countdown Live" on YouTube and TikTok, aimed at introducing the extended play and its songs, including "Letter to Myself", and connecting with her fanbase. On November 21, a live performance clip for "Letter to Myself" was released on her YouTube channel. On December 24, she appeared on KBS2's Lee Mujin Service and performed "Letter to Myself" along with other songs.

== Commercial performance ==
"Letter to Myself" debuted at number 22 on South Korea's Circle Digital Chart in the chart issue dated November 17–23, 2024; on its component charts, the song debuted at number four on the Circle Download Chart, number 43 on the Circle Streaming Chart, and number 19 on the Circle BGM Chart.

== Accolades ==
Awards and nominations for "Letter to Myself"
Award ceremony	Year	Category	Result	Ref.
MAMA Awards	2025	Best Vocal Performance – Solo	Nominated	
MAMA Awards	2025	Song of the Year	Longlisted	

== Credits and personnel ==
Credits adapted from Letter to Myself liner notes.

Studio

- SM Yellow Tail Studio – recording
- SM Wavelet Studio – recording
- SM Droplet Studio – recording
- SM Aube Studio – recording
- MonoTree Studio – Pro Tools operating
- SM Starlight Studio – digital editing
- SM Concert Hall Studio – mixing
- The Mastering Palace – mastering

Personnel

- SM Entertainment – executive producer
- Taeyeon – vocals, background vocals
- Ha Yoo-na (153/Joombas) – lyrics
- Dino Medanhodzic – composition, arrangement
- Johanna Jansson – composition
- Rena Lovelis – composition
- Nia Lovelis – composition
- Casey Moreta – composition
- Lee Joo-hyung – vocal directing, Pro Tools operating
- Emily Yeonseo Kim – background vocals
- Noh Min-ji – recording
- Kang Eun-ji – recording
- Kim Joo-hyun – recording
- Kim Hyo-joon – recording
- Jeong Yoo-ra – digital editing
- Nam Koong-jin – mixing
- Dave Kutch – mastering

== Charts ==
=== Weekly charts ===
Weekly chart performance for "Letter to Myself"
Chart (2024)	Peak position
South Korea (Circle)	22
Taiwan (Billboard)	22

=== Monthly charts ===
Monthly chart performance for "Letter to Myself"
Chart (2024)	Position
South Korea (Circle)	68

== Release history ==
Release history for "Letter to Myself"
Region	Date	Format	Label
Various	November 18, 2024	Digital download; streaming	SM; Kakao
