= Heaven (Taeyeon song) =

- Digital cover

Single by Taeyeon
- Language: Korean
- Released: July 8, 2024
- Genre: Dance-pop
- Length: 2:33
- Label: SM; Kakao
- Composers: Dino Medanhodzic; Maia Wright; Libby Whitehouse
- Lyricists: Lee Oh-neul; Leslie; Moon Ji-young (Lalala Studio); Jo Yoon-kyung

Taeyeon singles chronology
"Dream" (2023)	"Heaven" (2024)	"Letter to Myself" (2024)

Music video
- "Heaven" on YouTube

"Heaven" is a song recorded by South Korean singer Taeyeon. It was released by SM Entertainment on July 8, 2024.

== Background and release ==
On June 24, 2024, SM Entertainment announced that Taeyeon would be releasing a digital single titled "Heaven" on July 8. On July 1, the teaser video featuring a bear named "Gomven" was released. Six days later, the music video teaser was released. The song was released alongside its music video on July 8. A physical album in the form of "a recipe book featuring the song's visuals, a QR card for the soundtrack, and a mini photo card" was released on August 5.

== Composition ==
"Heaven" was written by Lee Oh-neul, Leslie, Moon Ji-young (Lalala Studio), and Jo Yoon-kyung, and composed and arranged by Dino Medanhodzic, with Maia Wright and Libby Whitehouse participating in the composition. It was described as a "dreamy" dance-pop song featuring "cheerful atmosphere" and characterized by "rhythmic guitar with a synth sound" with lyrics "comparing the refreshing moment of fulfillment to 'Heaven'". "Heaven" was composed in the key of E-flat minor, with a tempo of 114 beats per minute.

== Music video ==
The music video was released alongside the song by SM Entertainment on July 8, 2024. The "creepy atmosphere" visual depicts Taeyeon "preparing food with all her heart", with scenes switching between "her eating delicious food with her loved one", "her chasing 'Gomven' the bear", and choreography described as "embodying the refreshing and ecstatic feeling of reaching heaven" and featuring "free-feeling movements of [Taeyeon] running forward or dancing to the rhythm with [her] arms raised".

== Commercial performance ==
Professional ratings
Review scores
Source	Rating
IZM	3/5 stars

"Heaven" debuted at number 47 on South Korea's Circle Digital Chart in the chart issue dated July 7–13, 2024; on its component charts, the song debuted at number three on the Circle Download Chart, number 82 on the Circle Streaming Chart, and number 15 on the Circle BGM Chart. The physical album debuted at number 11 on the Circle Album Chart in the chart issue dated August 4–10, 2024.

== Promotion ==
Taeyeon first performed "Heaven" live in front of a total of 8,000 audiences at Kaohsiung Arena during concert ECO L!VE Concert on August 31, 2024.

== Credits and personnel ==
Credits adapted from the single's liner notes.

Studio

- SM Yellow Tail Studio – recording, digital editing
- SM Droplet Studio – recording
- SM Blue Cup Studio – mixing
- Sterling Sound – mastering

Personnel

- SM Entertainment – executive producer
- Taeyeon – vocals, background vocals
- Lee Oh-neul – lyrics
- Leslie – lyrics
- Moon Ji-young (Lalala Studio) – lyrics
- Jo Yoon-kyung – lyrics
- Dino Medanhodzic – composition, arrangement
- Maia Wright – composition
- Libby Whitehouse – composition
- Emily Yeonseo Kim – vocal directing
- Noh Min-ji – recording, digital editing
- Kim Joo-hyun – recording
- Jung Eui-seok – mixing
- Chris Gehringer – mastering

== Charts ==
=== Weekly charts ===
Weekly chart performance for "Heaven"
Chart (2024)	Peak position
South Korea (Circle)	47
South Korean Albums (Circle)	11

=== Monthly charts ===
Monthly chart performance for "Heaven"
Chart (2024)	Position
South Korea (Circle)	108
South Korea Albums (Circle)	45

== Release history ==
Release history for "Heaven"
Region	Date	Format	Label
Various	July 8, 2024	Digital download; streaming	SM; Kakao
South Korea	August 5, 2024	QR code	SM; Kakao
