= This Christmas: Winter Is Coming =

- Digital cover artwork

EP by Taeyeon
- Released: December 12, 2017
- Genres: Christmas; ballad; pop; R&B; jazz; blues; swing
- Length: 30:08
- Languages: Korean; English
- Label: SM
- Producer: Lee Soo-man (exec.)

Taeyeon chronology
My Voice (2017)	This Christmas: Winter Is Coming (2017)	Something New (2018)

Singles from This Christmas: Winter Is Coming
- 1. "This Christmas" Released: December 12, 2017; 2. "I'm All Ears" Released: January 12, 2018

This Christmas: Winter Is Coming is the first winter extended play and the third overall by South Korean singer Taeyeon. The extended play is marketed as a special Christmas album release. It was released by SM Entertainment on December 12, 2017.

== Release and promotion ==
This Christmas: Winter Is Coming and the music video for "This Christmas" were released on December 12, 2017. To promote the album, Taeyeon held a three-night concert titled "The Magic of Christmas Time" on December 22, 23 and 24, 2017 at Kyunghee University, Seoul.

== Composition ==
The EP consists of eight tracks, of which a variety of genres and the Christmas atmosphere is expressed through Taeyeon's powerful voice. The opening track "The Magic of Christmas Time" is a sweet English pop ballad song reminiscent of a beautiful animation set in a pure white snowy winter. The title track "This Christmas" is an authentic ballad song featuring a magnificent orchestral sound and the delicate and explosive singing ability of 'Taeyeon' and an instrumental version is also included. While "Let It Snow" is a swing genre song that provides bright energy with colorful guitar performances and brass, string sounds, and you can feel the excitement of Christmas. In addition, "Candy Cane" is a retro pop R&B song that creates a year-end festival atmosphere with jingle bells and rich wind instruments creates an even more joyous mood. "Shhhh" takes inspiration from jazz and blues that was written by poet Won Tae-yeon, who draws attention with its sexy, cute and fun lyrics about a girl looking for a gift hidden by Santa Claus. It contains an emotional pop ballad song "Christmas without You", a sentimental pop ballad song that contains a sad feeling of longing for a lover while looking at the happy scenery of Christmas. The closing track of this winter album is "I'm all ears", which Tamar Herman from Billboard described the track as "swaying", "sentimental pop-rock tune" that her vocal offering herself up as a shoulder to lean on. "I'm all ears" was also released as the EP's second and final single a month after the EP was released.

== Reception ==
This Christmas: Winter Is Coming debuted at number 2 on the South Korean Gaon Album Chart, and at number 6 on the Billboard World Albums Chart. "This Christmas" debuted at number 2 on the South Korean Gaon Digital Chart.

== Critical reception ==
Professional ratings
Review scores
Source	Rating
Idology	Positive
IZM	3/5 stars
The Korea Herald	Positive

This Christmas: Winter Is Coming received generally positive reviews from media outlets. Hong Dam-young from The Korea Herald considered the album's musical styles as "not like Mariah Carey's classic "All I Want for Christmas Is You". Instead of jingle bell sounds and flamboyant upbeat synths, the eight-track album is drenched in the singer’s calm and undeniable vocal prowess, an instrument on its own". While Idology's editor-in-chief Mimyo praised Taeyeon for creating new Christmas songs, "this album creates a 'new song' by taking the microscopic elements of the Western Christmas season song tradition (beyond 'salt shaker', jazz, etc.) in detail and combining them elegantly".

== Awards and nominations ==
Awards and nominations for This Christmas: Winter Is Coming
Year	Award	Category	Result	Ref.
2019	Golden Disc Awards	Disc Bonsang	Nominated	

== Track listing ==
This Christmas: Winter Is Coming
No.	Title	Lyrics	Music	Arrangement	Length
1.	"The Magic of Christmas Time"	Krysta Youngs; Robin Ghosh	Yan Perchuk; Ruslan Sirota; Myah Marie Langston; Krysta Youngs; Robin Ghosh	Yan Perchuk; Ruslan Sirota	2:47
2.	"This Christmas"	Score (13); Megatone (13)	Score (13); Megatone (13)	13	4:27
3.	"Let It Snow"	Shin Agnes (MonoTree)	Simon Petrén; Choo Dae-kwan (MonoTree)	Simon Petrén; DK Choo (MonoTree)	3:18
4.	"Candy Cane"	Hwang Hyun (MonoTree)	Matthew Tishler; Philip Bentley; Aimee Proal	Matthew Tishler	3:24
5.	"Christmas Without You"	Jo Yoon-kyung	Daniel "Obi" Klein; Charli Taft; Andreas Öberg	Daniel "Obi" Klein	4:19
6.	"Shhhh" (Korean: 쉿; RR: Swit)	Won Tae-yeon; Jung Jae-ha	Christopher Wortley; Mahan Moin; Greig Watts (DWB Music); Paul Drew (DWB Music); Pete Barringer (DWB Music)	DWB Music; Christopher Wortley	3:48
7.	"I'm All Ears" (Korean: 겨울나무; RR: Gyeounnamu; lit. 'Winter Tree')	Lee Joo-hyung (MonoTree)	Lee Joo-hyoung (MonoTree); Astrid Holiday	Lee Joo-hyung (MonoTree)	3:35
8.	"This Christmas" (instrumental)		Score (13); Megatone (13)	13	4:27
Total length:					30:05

== Credits and personnel ==
Credits adapted from the EP's liner notes.

Studio

- SM LVYIN Studio – recording (track 1–2)
- SM Big Shot Studio – recording (track 2–3, 5–6), digital editing (track 2)
- MonoTree Studio – recording (track 3, 7), Pro Tools operating (track 1, 3–7), digital editing (track 1, 3, 7)
- Seoul Studio – recording (track 2–3, 8)
- SM Yellow Tail Studio – recording (track 4), mixing (track 1, 4)
- Doobdoob Studio – digital editing (track 4–6)
- SM Blue Ocean Studio – mixing (track 2, 7–8)
- SM Concert Hall Studio – mixing (track 3)
- SM Blue Cup Studio – mixing (track 5–6)
- 821 Sound – mastering (all tracks)

Personnel

- SM Entertainment – executive producer
- Lee Soo-man – producer
- Taeyeon – vocals (all tracks), background vocals (track 1, 3–7)
- Krysta Youngs – lyrics, composition (track 1)
- Robin Ghosh – lyrics, composition (track 1)
- Yan Perchuk – producer, composition, arrangement (track 1)
- Ruslan Sirota – producer, composition, arrangement (track 1)
- Myah Marie Langston – composition (track 1)
- Score (13) a.k.a. Lee Kwan – producer, lyrics, composition, arrangement, piano (track 2, 8), vocal directing (track 2)
- Megatone (13) a.k.a. Kim Byung-seok – producer, lyrics, composition, arrangement (track 2, 8), vocal directing (track 2), bass (track 2, 7–8)
- Shin Agnes (MonoTree) – lyrics, background vocals (track 3)
- Simon Petrén – producer, composition, arrangement, piano, brass arrangement (track 3)
- Choo Dae-kwan a.k.a. DK Choo (MonoTree) – producer, composition, arrangement, vocal directing, strings conducting, strings arrangement, brass arrangement, recording, Pro Tools operating, digital editing (track 3)
- Hwang Hyun (MonoTree) – lyrics, vocal directing, Pro Tools operating (track 4)
- Matthew Tishler – producer, composition, arrangement (track 4)
- Philip Bentley – composition (track 4)
- Aimee Proal – composition (track 4)
- Jo Yoon-kyung – lyrics (track 5)
- Daniel "Obi" Klein – producer, composition, arrangement (track 5)
- Charli Taft – composition (track 5)
- Andreas Öberg – composition (track 5)
- Won Tae-yeon – lyrics (track 6)
- Jung Jae-ha – lyrics (track 6)
- Christopher Wortley – producer, composition, arrangement (track 6)
- Mahan Moin – composition, background vocals (track 6)
- Greig Watts (DWB Music) – producer, composition, arrangement (track 6)
- Paul Drew (DWB Music) – producer, composition, arrangement (track 6)
- Pete Barringer (DWB Music) – producer, composition, arrangement (track 6)
- Lee Joo-hyung (MonoTree) – producer, lyrics, composition, arrangement, keyboards, recording (track 7), vocal directing, Pro Tools operating (track 1, 5, 7), digital editing (track 1, 7)
- Astrid Holiday – composition (track 7)
- G-High (MonoTree) – vocal directing, Pro Tools operating (track 6)
- Felicia Barton – background vocals (track 4)
- Jukjae – guitar (track 2–3, 7–8)
- Kim Eun-seok – drums (track 2, 8)
- Yung – strings (track 2, 8)
- With Strings – strings (track 3)
- Park Oh-dal – strings conducting, strings arrangement (track 2, 8)
- Lee Ji-hong – recording (track 1–2)
- Lee Min-kyu – recording (track 2–3, 5–6), digital editing (track 2)
- Jeong Ki-hong – recording (track 2–3, 8)
- Choi Da-in – recording (track 2–3, 8)
- Ji Yong-joo – recording (track 2–3, 8)
- Koo Jong-pil – recording (track 4), mixing (track 1, 4)
- Jang Woo-young – digital editing (track 4–6)
- Kim Cheol-sun – mixing (track 2, 7–8)
- Nam Koong-jin – mixing (track 3)
- Jung Eui-seok – mixing (track 5–6)
- Kwon Nam-woo – mastering (all tracks)

== Charts ==
=== Weekly ===
Chart (2017)	Peak position
South Korean Albums (Gaon)	2
US World Albums (Billboard)	6

=== Monthly charts ===
Chart (2017)	Position
South Korean Albums (Gaon)	4

=== Year-end charts ===
Chart (2017)	Position
South Korean Albums (Gaon)	52

== Release history ==
Region	Date	Format	Label	Ref.
South Korea	December 12, 2017	CD; digital download; streaming	SM Entertainment	
Various	December 12, 2017	Digital download, streaming	SM Entertainment	
