= Voice (Taeyeon EP) =

- Digital and Regular edition cover

EP by Taeyeon
- Released: May 13, 2019
- Genre: J-pop
- Length: 22:04
- Label: SM Japan; EMI; Universal Music Japan

Taeyeon chronology
Something New (2018)	Voice (2019)	Purpose (2019)

Singles from Voice
- 1. "Voice" Released: May 13, 2019

Music video
- "Voice" on YouTube

Voice (stylized as VOICE) is the debut Japanese extended play and the fifth overall by South Korean singer Taeyeon. It was released digitally on May 13, 2019, by SM Entertainment Japan, and physically on June 5 by Universal Music Japan sublabel EMI Records.

== Background and release ==
On April 12, 2019, it was announced that Taeyeon would release her first Japanese EP in June. The album includes the title track "Voice" for a total of six tracks. It was released in three editions: First Limited Edition A (Live Edition/CD+DVD); First Limited Edition B (Visual Edition/CD+DVD/Photobook); and the Normal CD.

Voice was released digitally on May 13, 2019.

== Commercial performance ==
=== Japan ===
Voice debuted and peaked at number 6 on Oricon's Digital Albums Chart with 1,134 download albums sold. It also debuted number 30 on Billboard Japan's Hot Albums chart and peaked at number 6 in its second week. It also debuted and peaked at number 7 on Billboard Japan's Top Download Albums and at number 4 on Top Albums Sales with 19,330 estimated copies sold nationwide.

The EP debuted at number 2 on Oricon's Daily Albums Chart with 14,692 physical copies sold. The album debuted at number 6 on the Oricon Albums Chart with 17,174 physical copies sold in its first week.

=== Other territories ===
The EP debuted at number 11 on Billboard's World Albums chart for the week ending May 25, 2019.

== Track listing ==
Credits adapted from Naver

Voice
No.	Title	Lyrics	Music	Arrangement	Length
1.	"Voice"	STY (Digz Inc.)	Aaron Benward; Felicia Barton; Matthew Tishler	Matthew Tishler	3:11
2.	"I Found You"	Junji Ishiwatari	Sebastian Thott; Andreas Öberg; Skylar Mones; Courtney Woolsey	Sebastian Thott	3:51
3.	"Horizon"	Junji Ishiwatari	Geek Boy Al Swettenham; Megan Lee; Andy Love	Geek Boy Al Swettenham	3:51
4.	"Vanilla"	Sara Sakurai (T's Music)	Joe Lawrence; Linda "Shorelle" Quero	Joe Lawrence	4:01
5.	"Turnt and Burnt"	STY (Digz Inc.)	Willie Weeks; Yanka Lena	Willie Weeks	3:00
6.	"Signal"	STY (Digz Inc.)	Ricky Hanley; Christie Prentice; Daniel Sherman	Daniel Sherman	4:10
Total length:					22:10

CD+DVD – Limited Live Edition / Type A
No.	Title	Length
1.	"「TAEYEON -JAPAN SHOW CASE TOUR 2018–」"

CD+DVD – Limited Edition / Type B
No.	Title	Length
1.	"「Voice」" (Music Video & Visual Makings)

== Charts ==
Chart (2019)	Peak position
Japanese Albums (Oricon)	6
Japan Hot Albums (Billboard Japan)	6
US World Albums (Billboard)	11

== Release history ==
Region	Date	Format	Label
Various	May 13, 2019	Digital download, streaming	SM Entertainment Japan
Japan	June 5, 2019	CD, CD+DVD	Universal Music Japan, EMI Records
