= Letter to Myself =

- Digital cover

EP by Taeyeon
- Released: November 18, 2024
- Length: 17:53
- Language: Korean
- Labels: SM; Kakao

Taeyeon chronology
To. X (2023)	Letter to Myself (2024)	Panorama: The Best of Taeyeon (2025)

Singles from Letter to Myself
- 1. "Letter to Myself" Released: November 18, 2024

Letter to Myself is the sixth Korean-language extended play and the ninth overall by South Korean singer Taeyeon. It was released by SM Entertainment on November 18, 2024, and contains six tracks, including the lead single of the same name.

== Background and release ==
On October 27, 2024, SM Entertainment announced that Taeyeon would be releasing her sixth extended play titled Letter to Myself with the lead single of the same name on November 18. Two days later, the promotional schedule was released. On November 4, the prologue teaser video featuring the track "Disaster" as instrumental audio was released. Highlight clips for the album tracks "Blur", "Hot Mess", "Strangers", "Blue Eyes", and "Disaster", were released between November 7 and 13. The music video teasers for "Letter to Myself" were released on November 14 and 15. The extended play was released alongside the music video for "Letter to Myself" on November 18.

== Composition ==
Professional ratings
Review scores
Source	Rating
IZM	3/5 stars

Letter to Myself contains six tracks. The lead single, "Letter to Myself", was described as a pop rock song featuring "melodic guitar rhythm" with lyrics narrating "an honest letter conveying [Taeyeon's] present self to her past self with the awkward but solid words of comfort that was buried in her heart". The second track, "Hot Mess", was described as a pop song defined by "charismatic atmosphere" featuring "rough guitar distortion and cool synth rhythm" with lyrics about "not hesitating to choose imperfection even in a chaotic world". The third track, "Blue Eyes", was described as a R&B song highlighted by "sweet guitar line and rhythmic trap drums" with lyrics that "metaphorically expressing about falling in love without hesitation even in the midst of emotions crashing like huge waves".

The fourth track, "Strangers", was described as a R&B song distinguished by "delicate piano line and gently resonating guitar rhythm" with lyrics conveying "the loneliness and freedom that a stranger in an unfamiliar city feels among people, depicting a moment when unfamiliar yet strange emotions intersect". The fifth track, "Blur", was described as a R&B song driven by "groovy guitar rhythm, sensuous bass, and heavy drum beats" with lyrics delving into "the emotions felt when realizing one's own standards have become blurred while trying to match everything to other people's standards". The final track, "Disaster", was described as a pop rock song featuring "rough and dynamic drum beats combined with overwhelming synth lines" with lyrics conveying "the willingness on jumping into a love even though knowing that the end will be a disaster".

== Promotion ==
Prior to the release of Letter to Myself, on November 18, 2024, Taeyeon held a live event called "Taeyeon 'Letter to Myself' Countdown Live" on YouTube and TikTok, aimed at introducing the extended play and connecting with her fanbase. The live performance clip for "Letter to Myself" was released on November 21, followed by "Blur" on November 25, and "Disaster" on November 27, presented through her YouTube channel.

== Track listing ==
Letter to Myself track listing
No.	Title	Lyrics	Music	Arrangement	Length
1.	"Letter to Myself"	Ha Yoo-na (153/Joombas)	Dino Medanhodzic; Johanna Jansson; Rena Lovelis; Nia Lovelis; Casey Moreta	Dino Medanhodzic	3:04
2.	"Hot Mess"	Cha Yi-rin (153/Joombas)	Tommy Driscoll; Larzz Principato; Upsahl	Tommy Driscoll; Larzz Principato	2:29
3.	"Blue Eyes"	Han Ro-ro	Chantry Johnson; Ryan Follese; Alexander DeLeon	Chantry Johnson	3:02
4.	"Strangers"	Ha Yoo-na (153/Joombas)	Anthony M. Jones; Lauren Larue; Lindsey Lomis	Tone	2:50
5.	"Blur"	Choi In-yeong (Sweden Laundry); Wang Se-yun (Sweden Laundry)	Meron Mengist; Mike Squillante; Nick "Squids" Squillante	Mike Squillante; Nick "Squids" Squillante	3:15
6.	"Disaster"	Bay (153/Joombas); Ephy (153/Joombas)	Rob Resnick; Sarah de Warren; GiGi Grombacher	Rob Resnick; Sarah de Warren; GiGi Grombacher	3:13
Total length:					17:53

== Credits and personnel ==
Credits adapted from the EP's liner notes.

Studio

- SM Yellow Tail Studio – recording (track 1)
- SM Wavelet Studio – recording (track 1, 3, 6), digital editing (track 3)
- SM Droplet Studio – recording (track 1, 3, 5), digital editing (track 5)
- SM Aube Studio – recording (track 1–2), engineered for mix (track 2)
- SM LVYIN Studio – recording (track 2, 4, 6), digital editing (track 4)
- MonoTree Studio – recording (track 6), Pro Tools operating (track 1–2, 4–6)
- 77F Studio – digital editing (track 2)
- SM Starlight Studio – digital editing (track 1, 6), mixing (track 3)
- GCA Studio – engineered for mix (track 4)
- SM Concert Hall Studio – mixing (track 1)
- SM Blue Cup Studio – mixing (track 2, 6)
- KLANG Studio – mixing (track 4)
- SM Blue Ocean Studio – mixing (track 5)
- The Mastering Palace – mastering (all tracks)

Personnel

- SM Entertainment – executive producer
- Taeyeon – vocals, background vocals (all tracks)
- Ha Yoo-na (153/Joombas) – lyrics (track 1, 4)
- Dino Medanhodzic – composition, arrangement (track 1)
- Johanna Jansson – composition (track 1)
- Rena Lovelis – composition (track 1)
- Nia Lovelis – composition (track 1)
- Casey Moreta – composition (track 1)
- Cha Yi-rin (153/Joombas) – lyrics (track 2)
- Tommy Driscoll – composition, arrangement (track 2)
- Larzz Principato – composition, arrangement (track 2)
- Upsahl – composition (track 2)
- Han Ro-ro – lyrics (track 3)
- Chantry Johnson – composition, arrangement (track 3)
- Ryan Follese – composition (track 3)
- Alexander DeLeon – composition (track 3)
- Anthony M. Jones a.k.a. Tone – composition, arrangement (track 4)
- Lauren Larue – composition (track 4)
- Lindsey Lomis – composition (track 4)
- Choi In-yeong (Sweden Laundry) – lyrics (track 5)
- Wang Se-yun (Sweden Laundry) – lyrics (track 5)
- Meron Mengist – composition (track 5)
- Mike Squillante – composition, arrangement (track 5)
- Nick "Squids" Squillante – composition, arrangement (track 5)
- Bay (153/Joombas) – lyrics (track 6)
- Ephy (153/Joombas) – lyrics (track 6)
- Rob Resnick – composition, arrangement (track 6)
- Sarah de Warren – composition, arrangement (track 6)
- GiGi Grombacher – composition, arrangement (track 6)
- Lee Joo-hyung – vocal directing, Pro Tools operating (track 1–2, 4–6), background vocals, recording (track 6)
- Emily Yeonseo Kim – vocal directing (track 3), background vocals (track 1, 6)
- Noh Min-ji – recording (track 1)
- Kang Eun-ji – recording (track 1, 3, 6), digital editing (track 3)
- Kim Joo-hyun – recording (track 1, 3, 5), digital editing (track 5)
- Kim Hyo-joon – recording (track 1–2), engineered for mix (track 2)
- Lee Ji-hong – recording (track 2, 4, 6), digital editing (track 4)
- Woo Min-jeong – digital editing (track 2)
- Jeong Yoo-ra – digital editing (track 1, 6), mixing (track 3)
- Eom Se-hyun – engineered for mix (track 4)
- Nam Koong-jin – mixing (track 1)
- Jung Eui-seok – mixing (track 2, 6)
- Koo Jong-pil – mixing (track 4)
- Kim Cheol-sun – mixing (track 5)
- Dave Kutch – mastering (all tracks)

== Charts ==
=== Weekly charts ===
Weekly chart performance
Chart (2024)	Peak position
Japanese Digital Albums (Oricon)	14
Japanese Hot Albums (Billboard Japan)	55
South Korean Albums (Circle)	4

=== Monthly charts ===
Monthly chart performance
Chart (2024)	Position
South Korean Albums (Circle)	27

== Sales ==
Overall sales
Region	Sales
South Korea	130,428

== Release history ==
Release history
Region	Date	Format	Label
Various	November 18, 2024	Digital download; streaming	SM; Kakao
South Korea	November 18, 2024	CD; QR code	SM; Kakao
South Korea	November 29, 2024	NFC CD; NFC Chip	SM; Kakao
South Korea	April 28, 2025	LP	SM; Kakao
