= To. X =

- Digital cover

EP by Taeyeon
- Released: November 27, 2023
- Genres: R&B; pop
- Length: 17:52
- Languages: Korean; English
- Label: SM

Taeyeon chronology
INVU (2022)	To. X (2023)	Letter to Myself (2024)

Singles from To. X
- 1. "To. X" Released: November 27, 2023

To. X is the fifth Korean-language extended play and the eighth overall by South Korean singer Taeyeon. It was released by SM Entertainment on November 27, 2023, and contains six tracks, including the lead single of the same name.

== Background and release ==
On November 6, 2023, SM Entertainment announced Taeyeon would be releasing her fifth Korean extended play titled To. X on November 27. Two days later, the promotional schedule was released. On November 13, the mood sampler teaser video was released, followed by the highlight teaser video three days later. The highlight teaser video for "Burn It Now" was released on November 20, with "Melt Away" on November 21, followed by "Nightmare" on November 22, and "All For Nothing" on November 23. On November 24, the music video teaser video for "To. X" was released. The extended play was released alongside the music video for the lead single on November 27.

== Composition ==
To. X contains six tracks. The lead single, "To. X", is a R&B song that "combines sensuous guitar riffs and rhythmic melodies" with lyrics carrying the message of "[Taeyeon singing] about the end of a controlling relationship after realizing that the other person is controlling her". The second track, "Melt Away", is a R&B song that "combines sensual guitar riffs, trumpets, and percussion" with lyrics containing "a sense of leisure, arrogance, and confident that one can melt the cold heart of the other person". The third track, "Burn It Down", is a pop ballad song featuring "addictive guitar riff" with lyrics about "complaining that everything has been ruined as if everything was burned down by the other person who only hurt them under the guise of love". The fourth track, "Nightmare" (악몽), is a pop ballad song characterized by "simple acoustic guitar riff" with lyrics about "leaving without regrets after a sharp rebuke to the other person who was showing a weak side". The fifth track, "All For Nothing", is a pop ballad song with lyrics written by Taeyeon about "honestly express[ing] the feelings of being hurt by the other person who gave up everything". The final track, "Fabulous", is a R&B song with "jazzy and captivating atmosphere" characterized by "grand and colorful string and trumpet rhythm", its English lyrics describe "the feeling of self-confidence that everyone envies but at the same time feeling in danger".

== Commercial performance ==
To. X debuted at number three on South Korea's Circle Album Chart in the chart issue dated November 26 – December 2, 2023 and ascended to number two on the Circle Album Chart in the following two weeks; on the monthly chart, the EP debuted at number 14 in the chart issue for November 2023. In Japan, the EP debuted at number 50 on the Billboard Japan Hot Albums in the chart issue dated December 6, 2023; on its component chart, it debuted at number 20 on the Top Download Albums. On the Oricon chart, the EP debuted at number 19 on the Digital Albums Chart in the chart issue dated December 11, 2023. In the United Kingdom, the EP debuted at number 93 on the OCC's UK Album Downloads Chart in the chart issue dated December 1–7, 2023.

== Promotion ==
Prior to the release of To. X, on November 27, 2023, Taeyeon held a live event called "Taeyeon 'To. X' Countdown Live" on YouTube, TikTok, Weverse, and Idol Plus, aimed at introducing the extended play and connecting with her fanbase. Additionally, a pop-up store named "Letter 'To. X' Concept Room" was opened in Seoul, South Korea, running from November 27 to December 3. The live performance clip for "All For Nothing" was released on December 6, followed by "To.X" on December 8, and "Fabulous" on December 11 while the lyric video for "Nightmare" will be released on December 15, presented through her YouTube channel.

== Accolades ==
Awards and nominations for To. X
Award ceremony	Year	Category	Result	Ref.
Asian Pop Music Awards	2024	Top 20 Albums of the Year (Overseas)	Won	
Melon Music Awards	2024	Millions Top 10	Won	
Melon Music Awards	2024	Album of the Year	Nominated	

== Track listing ==
Track listing for To. X
No.	Title	Lyrics	Music	Arrangement	Length
1.	"To. X"	Kenzie	Stephen Puth; Dazy; Kristin Carpenter	Stephen Puth; Dazy	2:50
2.	"Melt Away"	Kang Eun-jeong	Kevin Wolfsohn; Paul Goller; Zara Larsson; Luke Andrew Grieve; Shakka Malcolm Philip; Abby-Lynn Keen; TMM	The Elements	3:16
3.	"Burn It Down"	Lee O-neul	Sibel Redžep	Gustav Blomberg	2:50
4.	"Nightmare" (악몽)	Hanroro	Celine Svanbäck; Jeppe London Bilsby; Lauritz Emil Christiansen; Svea Kågemark	Jeppe London Bilsby; Lauritz Emil Christiansen	2:55
5.	"All for Nothing"	Taeyeon; Hwang Yu-bin	Mike Robinson; Sarah Troy; Thomas Daniel	Mike Robinson	3:10
6.	"Fabulous"	Rachel Kanner; Sammie Gee	Rachel Kanner; Sammie Gee; Mich Hansen; Jacob Uchorczak; Oliver McEwan	Mich Hansen; Ubizz	2:51
Total length:					17:52

== Charts ==
=== Weekly charts ===
Weekly chart performance for To. X
Chart (2023)	Peak position
Japanese Digital Albums (Oricon)	19
Japanese Hot Albums (Billboard Japan)	50
South Korean Albums (Circle)	2
UK Album Downloads (Official Charts)	93

=== Monthly charts ===
Monthly chart performance for To. X
Chart (2023)	Position
South Korean Albums (Circle)	14

== Sales ==
Overall sales for To. X
Region	Sales
South Korea	155,027

== Release history ==
Release history for To. X
Region	Date	Format	Label
South Korea	November 27, 2023	CD	SM; Kakao
Various	November 27, 2023	Digital download; streaming	SM; Kakao
South Korea	March 4, 2024	LP	SM; Kakao
