= List of awards and nominations received by Taeyeon =

Taeyeon awards and nominations
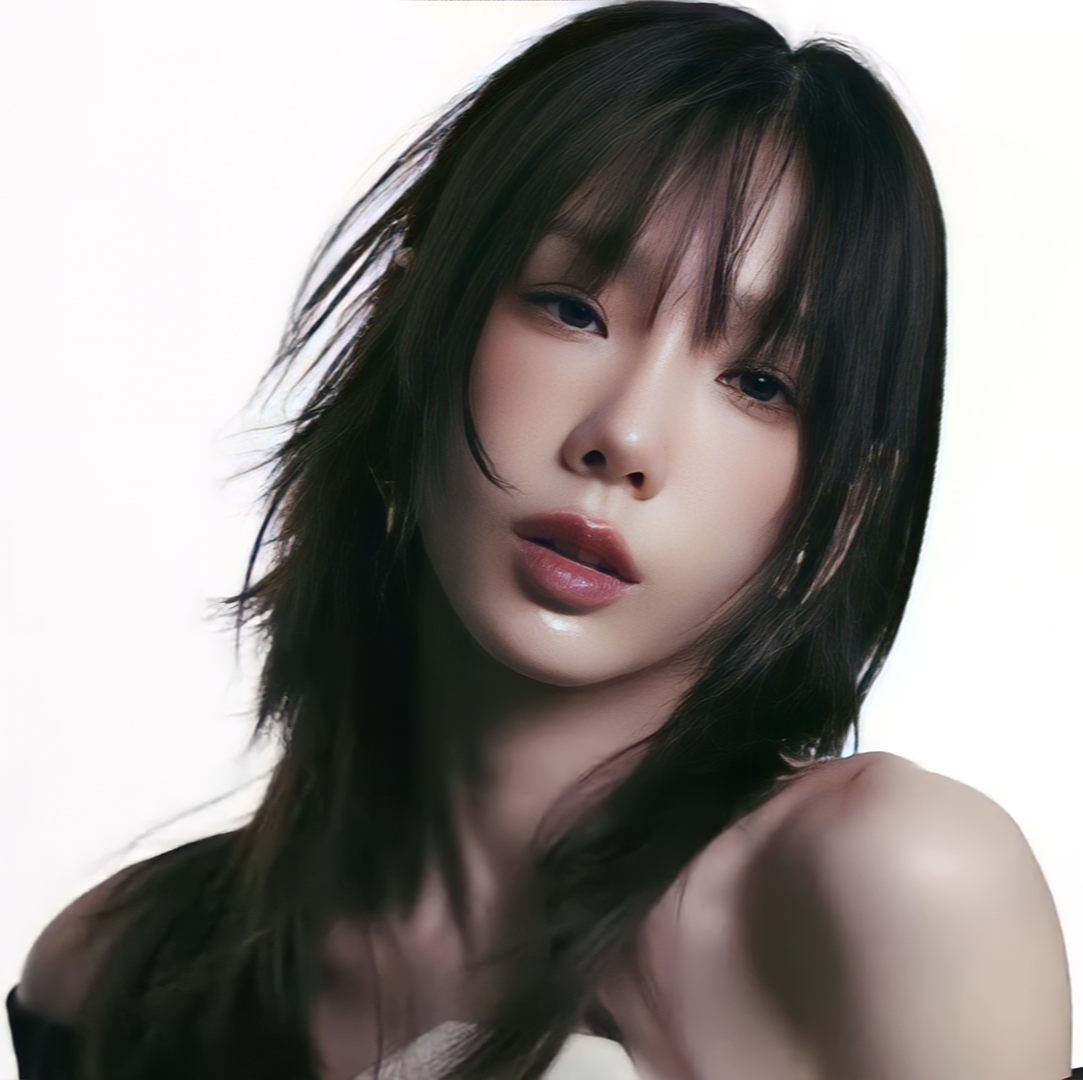
- Kim Tae-yeon in a photoshoot for Elle Taiwan in 2023
Awards and nominations
Award	Wins	Nominations
APAN Music Awards	0	4
APAN Star Awards	0	1
Asia Artist Awards	0	8
Asian Pop Music Awards	3	8
Brand Customer Loyalty Awards	3	4
Brand of the Year Awards	2	4
Bugs 20th Anniversary Awards	1	1
Circle Chart Music Awards	5	21
Cyworld Digital Music Awards	1	1
D Awards	0	1
The Fact Music Awards	0	1
Genie Music Awards	1	8
Golden Disc Awards	7	29
Hanteo Music Awards	0	7
K-Music and Arts Film Festival	2	4
KAZZ Awards	1	1
KKBOX Music Awards	1	1
Korea Drama Awards	0	3
Korea Grand Music Awards	0	4
Korea First Brand Awards	3	3
Korean Music Awards	0	4
MAMA Awards	4	52
MBC Drama Awards	1	1
MBC Program Production Awards	1	1
Melon Music Awards	4	29
Mnet 20's Choice Awards	1	1
The Musical Awards	0	1
Naver Fashion Beauty x Celeb's Pick	1	1
Philippine K-pop Awards	2	2
Republic of Korea Entertainment Arts Awards	1	1
Seoul International Drama Awards	2	5
Seoul International Youth Film Festival	1	1
Seoul Music Awards	6	31
Soompi Awards	1	7
Soribada Best K-Music Awards	0	6
TMELive International Music Awards	1	1

Totals (Note: Certain award groups do not simply award one winner. They acknowledge several different recipients, have runners-up, and have third place. Since this is a specific recognition and is different from losing an award, runner-up mentions are considered wins in this award tally. For simplification and to avoid errors, each award in this list has been presumed to have had a prior nomination.)
- Wins: 56
- Nominations: 255

South Korean singer Taeyeon has received multiple awards and nominations for her music work. She debuted in 2007 as a member of girl group Girls' Generation and initially achieved several awards and nominations for her early solo endeavors. In 2008, she won a Golden Disc Award in the Popularity category and a Cyworld Digital Music Award for Song of the Month with her OST song "If". She also earned two MBC Drama Awards and a Mnet 20's Choice Award for her radio show Taeyeon's Chin Chin Radio in 2009.

In 2015, Taeyeon debuted as a solo artist with her extended play I, from which the title track "I" earned her multiple awards and nominations, including a Gaon Chart Music Award for Song of the Year – October and a Golden Disc Award in the Digital category. Her success earned her Best Female Artist at both the Mnet Asian Music Awards in 2015 and Golden Disc Awards the following year. The title track "I" raked in a total of eleven trophies on five music programs.

In 2016, Taeyeon released her second extended play Why which yielded two singles, "Starlight" and "Why". She also released two digital singles, "Rain" and "11:11", and earned three trophies on music programs. "Rain" won a Golden Disc Award in the Digital category while Taeyeon herself won another Mnet Asian Music Award for Best Female Artist and a Melon Music Award for Top 10 Artists.

Taeyeon's first studio album, titled My Voice, was released in February 2017 and produced a lead single titled "Fine" which earned her two trophies on music programs. The album was well-received and earned multiple awards and nominations, including a Golden Disc Award in the Physical Category and a first nomination at the Korean Music Awards for Best Pop Album. In December 2017, Taeyeon released her first special extended play This Christmas: Winter Is Coming with title track "This Christmas". In 2018, she released her third extended play Something New.

In 2019, Taeyeon released a digital single "Four Seasons" which won the Digital Daesang (Grand Prize) at the 29th Seoul Music Awards and multiple other awards. In the same year, she released her debut Japanese extended play Voice and her second studio album Purpose which earned her a second nomination for Best Pop Album at the Korean Music Awards. She also released an OST song "All About You" which won Best OST at the Seoul Music Awards. Taeyeon herself earned a Bonsang at the Seoul Music Awards and another Melon Music Award for Top 10 Artists. Four Seasons and Purpose's lead single "Spark" earned her five trophies on music programs.

== Awards and nominations ==
Name of the award ceremony, year presented, category, nominee of the award, and the result of the nomination
Award ceremony	Year	Category	Nominee / Work	Result	Ref.
APAN Music Awards	2020	KT Seezn Star Award – Singer	Taeyeon	Nominated	
APAN Music Awards	2020	Idol Champ Popularity Award – Female Solo	Taeyeon	Nominated	
APAN Music Awards	2020	Idol Champ Global Choice – Female Solo	Taeyeon	Nominated	
APAN Music Awards	2020	Best OST	"Kiss Me"	Nominated	
APAN Star Awards	2024	Best OST	"Dream"	Nominated	
Asia Artist Awards	2021	Female Solo Singer Popularity Award	Taeyeon	Nominated	
Asia Artist Awards	2022	Idol Plus Popularity Award – Music	Taeyeon	Nominated	
Asia Artist Awards	2023	Popularity Award – Music (Female)	Taeyeon	Nominated	
Asia Artist Awards	2024	Popularity Award – Music (Female)	Taeyeon	Nominated	
Asia Artist Awards	2025	Popularity Award – Singer (Female)	Taeyeon	Nominated	
Asia Artist Awards	2026	Popularity Award – Solo (Female)	Taeyeon	Pending	
Asian Pop Music Awards	2022	Best Female Artist (Overseas)	Taeyeon	Nominated	
Asian Pop Music Awards	2022	Best Music Video (Overseas)	"INVU"	Nominated	
Asian Pop Music Awards	2022	Best Albums of the Year (Overseas)	INVU	Nominated	
Asian Pop Music Awards	2022	Top 20 Albums of the Year (Overseas)	INVU	Won	
Asian Pop Music Awards	2022	Best OST (Overseas)	"Little Garden"	Won	
Asian Pop Music Awards	2024	Top 20 Albums of the Year (Overseas)	To. X	Won	
Asian Pop Music Awards	2024	Best Collaboration (Overseas)	"Time Machine" (with Doyoung and Mark)	Nominated	
Asian Pop Music Awards	2024	Best Female Artist (Overseas)	Taeyeon	Nominated	
Brand Customer Loyalty Awards	2021	Best Female Vocalist	Taeyeon	Nominated	
Brand Customer Loyalty Awards	2022	Best Female Solo Singer	Taeyeon	Won	
Brand Customer Loyalty Awards	2024	Best Female Solo Singer	Taeyeon	Won	
Brand Customer Loyalty Awards	2026	Best Female Vocalist	Taeyeon	Won	
Brand of the Year Awards	2022	Female Solo Singer of the Year	Taeyeon	Won	
Brand of the Year Awards	2022	Female Entertainer Idol of the Year	Taeyeon	Nominated	
Brand of the Year Awards	2024	Female Solo Singer of the Year	Taeyeon	Nominated	
Brand of the Year Awards	2024	Female Solo Singer of the Year (Vietnam's Choice)	Taeyeon	Won	
Bugs! 20th Anniversary Awards	2020	Most Loved Artists	Taeyeon	Won	
Circle Chart Music Awards	2016	Song of the Year – October	"I"	Won	
Circle Chart Music Awards	2016	Album of the Year – 4th Quarter	I	Nominated	
Circle Chart Music Awards	2017	Song of the Year – February	"Rain"	Nominated	
Circle Chart Music Awards	2017	Song of the Year – June	"Starlight"	Nominated	
Circle Chart Music Awards	2017	Song of the Year – June	"Why"	Nominated	
Circle Chart Music Awards	2017	Song of the Year – November	"11:11"	Nominated	
Circle Chart Music Awards	2018	Mobile Vote Popularity Award	Taeyeon	Won	
Circle Chart Music Awards	2018	Album of the Year – 1st Quarter	My Voice	Nominated	
Circle Chart Music Awards	2018	Song of the Year – February	"Fine"	Nominated	
Circle Chart Music Awards	2018	Song of the Year – December	"This Christmas"	Nominated	
Circle Chart Music Awards	2020	Artist of the Year – Digital Music (March)	"Four Seasons"	Won	
Circle Chart Music Awards	2020	Artist of the Year – Digital Music (October)	"Spark"	Nominated	
Circle Chart Music Awards	2021	Artist of the Year – Digital Music (January)	"Dear Me"	Nominated	
Circle Chart Music Awards	2021	Artist of the Year – Digital Music (May)	"Happy"	Nominated	
Circle Chart Music Awards	2021	Mubeat Global Choice – Female	Taeyeon	Nominated	
Circle Chart Music Awards	2022	Artist of the Year – Digital Music (December)	"What Do I Call You"	Won	
Circle Chart Music Awards	2022	Artist of the Year – Digital Music (July)	"Weekend"	Nominated	
Circle Chart Music Awards	2022	Mubeat Global Choice – Female	Taeyeon	Nominated	
Circle Chart Music Awards	2023	Artist of the Year – Global Digital Music (February)	"INVU"	Won	
Circle Chart Music Awards	2023	Artist of the Year – Global Digital Music (January)	"Can't Control Myself"	Nominated	
Circle Chart Music Awards	2024	Mubeat Global Choice Award — Female	Taeyeon	Nominated	
Cyworld Digital Music Awards	2008	Song of the Month (February)	"If"	Won	
D Awards	2025	Best Girl Solo Popularity Award	Taeyeon	Nominated	
The Fact Music Awards	2025	FAN N STAR Choice – Individual	Taeyeon	Nominated	
Genie Music Awards	2018	Artist of the Year	Taeyeon	Nominated	
Genie Music Awards	2018	Female Artist Award	Taeyeon	Nominated	
Genie Music Awards	2018	Genie Music Popularity Award	Taeyeon	Nominated	
Genie Music Awards	2019	The Female Solo Artist	Taeyeon	Nominated	
Genie Music Awards	2022	Best Female Solo Artist	Taeyeon	Won	
Genie Music Awards	2022	Singer of the Year	Taeyeon	Nominated	
Genie Music Awards	2022	Genie Music Popularity Award	Taeyeon	Nominated	
Genie Music Awards	2022	Album of the Year	INVU	Nominated	
Golden Disc Awards	2008	Popularity Award	"Can You Hear Me"	Won	
Golden Disc Awards	2008	Digital Bonsang	"Can You Hear Me"	Nominated	
Golden Disc Awards	2016	Digital Bonsang	"I"	Won	
Golden Disc Awards	2016	iQiyi Best Female Artist	Taeyeon	Won	
Golden Disc Awards	2016	Digital Daesang	"I"	Nominated	
Golden Disc Awards	2016	Disc Bonsang	I	Nominated	
Golden Disc Awards	2016	Global Popularity Award	Taeyeon	Nominated	
Golden Disc Awards	2016	Popularity Award	Taeyeon	Nominated	
Golden Disc Awards	2017	Digital Bonsang	"Rain"	Won	
Golden Disc Awards	2017	Digital Daesang	"Rain"	Nominated	
Golden Disc Awards	2017	Disc Bonsang	Why	Nominated	
Golden Disc Awards	2017	Popularity Award	Taeyeon	Nominated	
Golden Disc Awards	2018	Disc Bonsang	My Voice	Won	
Golden Disc Awards	2018	Digital Bonsang	"Fine"	Nominated	
Golden Disc Awards	2018	Disc Daesang	My Voice	Nominated	
Golden Disc Awards	2018	Global Popularity Award	Taeyeon	Nominated	
Golden Disc Awards	2019	Disc Bonsang	This Christmas: Winter Is Coming	Nominated	
Golden Disc Awards	2019	Popularity Award	Taeyeon	Nominated	
Golden Disc Awards	2020	Digital Bonsang	"Four Seasons"	Won	
Golden Disc Awards	2020	Digital Daesang	"Four Seasons"	Nominated	
Golden Disc Awards	2020	Disc Bonsang	Purpose	Nominated	
Golden Disc Awards	2020	TikTok Golden Disc Popularity Award	Taeyeon	Nominated	
Golden Disc Awards	2022	Digital Bonsang	"Weekend"	Nominated	
Golden Disc Awards	2022	Seezn Most Popular Artist Award	Taeyeon	Nominated	
Golden Disc Awards	2023	Digital Bonsang	"INVU"	Nominated	
Golden Disc Awards	2023	TikTok Most Popular Artist Award	Taeyeon	Nominated	
Golden Disc Awards	2025	Digital Bonsang	"To. X"	Won	
Golden Disc Awards	2025	Digital Daesang	"To. X"	Nominated	
Golden Disc Awards	2025	Most Popular Artist Award (Female)	Taeyeon	Nominated	
Hanteo Music Awards	2021	Artist Award - Female Solo	Taeyeon	Nominated	
Hanteo Music Awards	2022	Artist of the Year - Main Prize	Taeyeon	Nominated	
Hanteo Music Awards	2023	Artist of the Year - Main Prize	Taeyeon	Nominated	
Hanteo Music Awards	2023	Special Award (Ballad)	Taeyeon	Nominated	
Hanteo Music Awards	2024	Artist of the Year - Main Prize	Taeyeon	Nominated	
Hanteo Music Awards	2024	Global Artist Award	Taeyeon	Nominated	
Hanteo Music Awards	2024	Special Award (Ballad)	Taeyeon	Nominated	
K-Music and Arts Film Festival	2022	Best Music	"INVU"	Won	
K-Music and Arts Film Festival	2022	Best Fashion	"INVU"	Won	
K-Music and Arts Film Festival	2022	Best Production Design	"INVU"	Nominated	
K-Music and Arts Film Festival	2022	Best Actor in Music Video	"Can't Control Myself"	Nominated	
KAZZ Awards	2018	Best Asian Concert Award	Taeyeon	Won	
KKBox Music Awards	2016	Korean Artist of the Year	Taeyeon	Won	
Korea Drama Awards	2012	Best Original Soundtrack	"Missing You Like Crazy"	Nominated	
Korea Drama Awards	2019	Best Original Soundtrack	"All About You"	Nominated	
Korea Drama Awards	2024	Best Original Soundtrack	"Dream"	Nominated	
Korea Grand Music Awards	2024	Best OST	"Dream"	Nominated	
Korea Grand Music Awards	2024	Best Songs 10	"To. X"	Nominated	
Korea Grand Music Awards	2024	Trend of the Year – K-pop Solo	Taeyeon	Nominated	
Korea Grand Music Awards	2025	Trend of the Year – K-pop Solo	Taeyeon	Nominated	
Korea First Brand Awards	2023	The Female Solo Singer Award	Taeyeon	Won	
Korea First Brand Awards	2025	Best Vocalist (Vietnam's Choice)	Taeyeon	Won	
Korea First Brand Awards	2026	Best Vocalist (Indonesia's Choice)	Taeyeon	Won	
Korean Music Awards	2018	Best Pop Album	My Voice	Nominated	
Korean Music Awards	2020	Best Pop Album	Purpose	Nominated	
Korean Music Awards	2023	Best K-Pop Album	INVU	Nominated	
Korean Music Awards	2023	Best Electronic Song	"INVU (Moon Kyoo Remix)"	Nominated	
MAMA Awards	2008	Best OST	"If"	Nominated	
MAMA Awards	2011	Best OST	"I Love You"	Nominated	
MAMA Awards	2012	Best OST	"Missing You Like Crazy"	Nominated	
MAMA Awards	2015	Best Female Artist	Taeyeon	Won	
MAMA Awards	2015	Artist of the Year	Taeyeon	Nominated	
MAMA Awards	2015	Best Female Vocal Performance	"I"	Nominated	
MAMA Awards	2015	Song of the Year	"I"	Nominated	
MAMA Awards	2016	Best Female Artist	Taeyeon	Won	
MAMA Awards	2016	Artist of the Year	Taeyeon	Nominated	
MAMA Awards	2016	Best Vocal Performance – Female Solo	"Rain"	Nominated	
MAMA Awards	2016	Song of the Year	"Rain"	Nominated	
MAMA Awards	2017	Artist of the Year	Taeyeon	Nominated	
MAMA Awards	2017	Best Female Artist	Taeyeon	Nominated	
MAMA Awards	2018	Artist of the Year	Taeyeon	Nominated	
MAMA Awards	2018	Best Female Artist	Taeyeon	Nominated	
MAMA Awards	2019	Best Vocal Performance – Solo	"Four Seasons"	Won	
MAMA Awards	2019	Song of the Year	"Four Seasons"	Nominated	
MAMA Awards	2019	Artist of the Year	Taeyeon	Nominated	
MAMA Awards	2019	Best Female Artist	Taeyeon	Nominated	
MAMA Awards	2019	Qoo10 Favorite Female Artist	Taeyeon	Nominated	
MAMA Awards	2019	Worldwide Fans' Choice	Taeyeon	Nominated	
MAMA Awards	2020	Artist of the Year	Taeyeon	Nominated	
MAMA Awards	2020	Best Female Artist	Taeyeon	Nominated	
MAMA Awards	2020	Best Vocal Performance – Solo	"Spark"	Nominated	
MAMA Awards	2020	Song of the Year	"Spark"	Nominated	
MAMA Awards	2020	Worldwide Fans' Choice	Taeyeon	Nominated	
MAMA Awards	2021	Artist of the Year	Taeyeon	Nominated	
MAMA Awards	2021	Best Dance Performance – Solo	"Weekend"	Nominated	
MAMA Awards	2021	Best Female Artist	Taeyeon	Nominated	
MAMA Awards	2021	Song of the Year	"Weekend"	Nominated	
MAMA Awards	2021	Worldwide Fans' Choice	Taeyeon	Nominated	
MAMA Awards	2022	Best Vocal Performance – Solo	"INVU"	Won	
MAMA Awards	2022	Album of the Year	INVU	Nominated	
MAMA Awards	2022	Artist of the Year	Taeyeon	Nominated	
MAMA Awards	2022	Best Female Artist	Taeyeon	Nominated	
MAMA Awards	2022	Song of the Year	"INVU"	Nominated	
MAMA Awards	2024	Best Vocal Performance – Solo	"To. X"	Nominated	
MAMA Awards	2024	Song of the Year	"To. X"	Nominated	
MAMA Awards	2024	Song of the Year	"Dream"	Nominated	
MAMA Awards	2024	Best OST	"Dream"	Nominated	
MAMA Awards	2024	Best Female Artist	Taeyeon	Nominated	
MAMA Awards	2024	Artist of the Year	Taeyeon	Nominated	
MAMA Awards	2024	Fans' Choice of the Year	Taeyeon	Nominated	
MAMA Awards	2024	Fans' Choice Top 10 – Female	Taeyeon	Nominated	
MAMA Awards	2025	Artist of the Year	Taeyeon	Nominated	
MAMA Awards	2025	Best Female Artist	Taeyeon	Nominated	
MAMA Awards	2025	Fans' Choice Top 10 – Female	Taeyeon	Nominated	
MAMA Awards	2025	Song of the Year	"Letter to Myself"	Nominated	
MAMA Awards	2025	Best Vocal Performance – Solo	"Letter to Myself"	Nominated	
MAMA Awards	2026	Artist of the Year	Taeyeon	Pending	
MAMA Awards	2026	Best Female Artist	Taeyeon	Pending	
MAMA Awards	2026	Fans' Choice Top 10 – Female	Taeyeon	Pending	
MBC Drama Awards	2009	Radio Newcomer Award	Taeyeon's Chin Chin Radio	Won	
MBC Program Production Awards	2009	Excellence Program Award in Radio FM	Taeyeon's Chin Chin Radio	Won	
Melon Music Awards	2011	Best OST	"I Love You"	Nominated	
Melon Music Awards	2016	Top 10 Artist	Taeyeon	Won	
Melon Music Awards	2016	Best Ballad Song	"Rain"	Nominated	
Melon Music Awards	2017	Best Ballad Award	"Fine"	Nominated	
Melon Music Awards	2017	Top 10 Artist	Taeyeon	Nominated	
Melon Music Awards	2018	Hot Trend Award	"Page 0" (with MeloMance)	Nominated	
Melon Music Awards	2019	Best Ballad	"Four Seasons"	Won	
Melon Music Awards	2019	Top 10 Artist	Taeyeon	Won	
Melon Music Awards	2019	Artist of the Year	Taeyeon	Nominated	
Melon Music Awards	2019	Netizen Popularity Award	Taeyeon	Nominated	
Melon Music Awards	2020	Best R&B/Soul	"Happy"	Nominated	
Melon Music Awards	2020	Top 10 Artist	Taeyeon	Nominated	
Melon Music Awards	2021	Best Female Solo	Taeyeon	Nominated	
Melon Music Awards	2021	Netizen Popularity Award	Taeyeon	Nominated	
Melon Music Awards	2021	Top 10 Artist	Taeyeon	Nominated	
Melon Music Awards	2022	Top 10 Artist	Taeyeon	Nominated	
Melon Music Awards	2022	Best Female Solo	Taeyeon	Nominated	
Melon Music Awards	2022	Artist of the Year	Taeyeon	Nominated	
Melon Music Awards	2022	Song of the Year	"INVU"	Nominated	
Melon Music Awards	2022	Album of the Year	INVU	Nominated	
Melon Music Awards	2024	Millions Top 10	To. X	Won	
Melon Music Awards	2024	Top 10 Artist	Taeyeon	Nominated	
Melon Music Awards	2024	Best Female Solo	Taeyeon	Nominated	
Melon Music Awards	2024	Album of the Year	To. X	Nominated	
Melon Music Awards	2024	Song of the Year	"To. X"	Nominated	
Melon Music Awards	2024	Best OST	"Dream"	Nominated	
Melon Music Awards	2025	Best Female Solo	Taeyeon	Nominated	
Melon Music Awards	2026	Best Female Solo	Taeyeon	Nominated	
Melon Music Awards	2026	Top 10 Artists	Taeyeon	Nominated	
Mnet 20's Choice Awards	2008	Hot Radio DJ	Kangin and Taeyeon's Chin Chin Radio	Won	
The Musical Awards	2011	Best Newcomer	Midnight Sun	Nominated	
Naver Fashion Beauty x Celeb's Pick	2016	Fashionista Award	Taeyeon	Won	
Philippine K-pop Awards	2015	Best Female Artist	Taeyeon	Won	
Philippine K-pop Awards	2016	Best Female Artist	Taeyeon	Won	
Republic of Korea Entertainment Arts Awards	2010	Female Radio Host Award	Taeyeon's Chin Chin Radio	Won	
Seoul International Drama Awards	2012	Outstanding Korean Drama – Best Original Soundtrack	"Missing You Like Crazy"	Won	
Seoul International Drama Awards	2013	Outstanding Korean Drama – Best Original Soundtrack	"Closer"	Nominated	
Seoul International Drama Awards	2013	Outstanding Korean Drama – Best Original Soundtrack	"And One"	Nominated	
Seoul International Drama Awards	2015	Outstanding Korean Drama – Best Original Soundtrack	"Love, That One Word"	Won	
Seoul International Drama Awards	2026	Outstanding Korean Drama – Best Original Soundtrack	"Pieces"	Nominated	
Seoul International Youth Film Festival	2014	Best OST by a Female Artist	"Love, That One Word"	Won	
Seoul Music Awards	2016	Bonsang Award	Taeyeon	Won	
Seoul Music Awards	2016	Daesang Award	Taeyeon	Nominated	
Seoul Music Awards	2016	Popularity Award	Taeyeon	Nominated	
Seoul Music Awards	2017	Bonsang Award	Taeyeon	Won	
Seoul Music Awards	2017	Daesang Award	Taeyeon	Nominated	
Seoul Music Awards	2017	Popularity Award	Taeyeon	Nominated	
Seoul Music Awards	2018	Bonsang Award	Taeyeon	Nominated	
Seoul Music Awards	2018	Hallyu Special Award	Taeyeon	Nominated	
Seoul Music Awards	2018	Popularity Award	Taeyeon	Nominated	
Seoul Music Awards	2020	Bonsang Award	Taeyeon	Won	
Seoul Music Awards	2020	Digital Daesang	"Four Seasons"	Won	
Seoul Music Awards	2020	OST Award	"All About You"	Won	
Seoul Music Awards	2020	K-Wave Popularity Award	Taeyeon	Nominated	
Seoul Music Awards	2020	Popularity Award	Taeyeon	Nominated	
Seoul Music Awards	2020	QQ Music Most Popular K-Pop Artist Award	Taeyeon	Nominated	
Seoul Music Awards	2021	Bonsang Award	Taeyeon	Nominated	
Seoul Music Awards	2021	K-Wave Popularity Award	Taeyeon	Nominated	
Seoul Music Awards	2021	OST Award	"Kiss Me"	Nominated	
Seoul Music Awards	2021	Popularity Award	Taeyeon	Nominated	
Seoul Music Awards	2022	Bonsang Award	Taeyeon	Nominated	
Seoul Music Awards	2022	K-Wave Popularity Award	Taeyeon	Nominated	
Seoul Music Awards	2022	Popularity Award	Taeyeon	Nominated	
Seoul Music Awards	2022	U+Idol Live Best Artist Award	Taeyeon	Nominated	
Seoul Music Awards	2023	Bonsang Award	Taeyeon	Won	
Seoul Music Awards	2023	Daesang Award	Taeyeon	Nominated	
Seoul Music Awards	2023	K-Wave Popularity Award	Taeyeon	Nominated	
Seoul Music Awards	2023	Popularity Award	Taeyeon	Nominated	
Seoul Music Awards	2025	Bonsang Award	Taeyeon	Nominated	
Seoul Music Awards	2025	K-Wave Popularity Award	Taeyeon	Nominated	
Seoul Music Awards	2025	Popularity Award	Taeyeon	Nominated	
Seoul Music Awards	2025	K-Pop World Choice - Solo	Taeyeon	Nominated	
Soompi Awards	2017	Best Female Solo	Taeyeon	Won	
Soompi Awards	2017	Album of the Year	Why	Nominated	
Soompi Awards	2017	Artist of the Year	Taeyeon	Nominated	
Soompi Awards	2017	Best Collaboration	"Don't Forget" (with Crush)	Nominated	
Soompi Awards	2017	Fuse Music Video of the Year	"Rain"	Nominated	
Soompi Awards	2017	Song of the Year	"Why"	Nominated	
Soompi Awards	2018	Best Female Solo	Taeyeon	Nominated	
Soribada Best K-Music Awards	2018	Bonsang Award	Taeyeon	Nominated	
Soribada Best K-Music Awards	2018	Global Fandom Award	Taeyeon	Nominated	
Soribada Best K-Music Awards	2018	Popularity Award (Female)	Taeyeon	Nominated	
Soribada Best K-Music Awards	2020	Bonsang Award	Taeyeon	Nominated	
Soribada Best K-Music Awards	2020	Global Artist Award	Taeyeon	Nominated	
Soribada Best K-Music Awards	2020	Popularity Award (Female)	Taeyeon	Nominated	
TMELive International Music Awards	2026	The Most Influental Artist of The Year	Taeyeon	Won	

== Other accolades ==
=== State honors ===
Name of country or organization, year given, and name of honor
Country or organization	Year	Honor	Ref.
South Korea (Note: Honors are given at the Korea's Financial Day Ceremony, hosted by the Financial Services Commission. They are awarded to those who have contributed to encourage the development of Korean finance.)	2025	Prime Minister's Commendation	

=== Listicles ===
Name of publisher, year listed, name of listicle, and placement
Publisher	Year	Listicle	Placement	Ref.
Forbes	2016	Korea Power Celebrity	32nd	
Forbes	2018	Korea Power Celebrity	16th	

== See also ==
- List of awards and nominations received by Girls' Generation
- List of awards and nominations received by Girls' Generation-TTS
