= What Do I Call You =

EP by Taeyeon
- Released: December 15, 2020
- Genres: R&B; pop; trap; ballad
- Length: 15:22
- Language: Korean
- Labels: SM; Dreamus
- Producer: Lee Soo-man (exec.)

Taeyeon chronology
#GirlsSpkOut (2020)	What Do I Call You (2020)	INVU (2022)

Singles from What Do I Call You
- 1. "What Do I Call You" Released: December 15, 2020

What Do I Call You is the fourth Korean-language extended play and the seventh overall by South Korean singer Taeyeon. The EP was released on December 15, 2020, by SM Entertainment and consists of six tracks, including the title track of the same name and her previous digital single "Happy".

== Background and release ==
On November 20, 2020, SM Entertainment announced that Taeyeon was preparing to release an EP the following month. On November 30, Taeyeon teased her comeback on her social media with the message, "I'll be coming back soon." On December 3, SM Entertainment announced that her fourth EP What Do I Call You would be released on December 15, 2020. Preorders began the same day. This marks Taeyeon's first domestic comeback in seven months since "Happy", released on May 4, 2020.

== Composition ==
The digital edition of What Do I Call You contains five songs, while the physical release contains six songs including the single "Happy", which was released as a digital single on May 4, 2020. There are two versions of the physical edition, with each featuring a different cover, CD-ROM design, booklet, poster, postcard, bookmark and photo card.

The EP incorporates various genres, primarily R&B and pop.

== Commercial performance ==
Upon release, the title track "What Do I Call You" ranked first on major music charts such as Genie and Bugs. The other tracks in the album also ranked highly in the charts. The album took over iTunes charts in 22 regions. It tied with her previous album Purpose and Hwasa's María for the third most national iTunes number ones for an album by a Korean female soloist, ranking behind her repackage edition of Purpose and Wendy's Like Water. The album also ranked number one in China's largest music site QQ Music and KuGou Music digital album sales chart.

In South Korea, What Do I Call You debuted at number four on the Gaon Album Chart with 99,065 copies sold. The album became Taeyeon's seventh top ten album in the country, and broke the record for the largest sales for a female soloist in 2020 with 89,263 copies on Hanteo. As of February 2021, it has sold over 124,442 units in South Korea, becoming her fifth album sold over 100,000 copies, following her four previous albums: I (2015), Why (2016), My Voice (2017) and Purpose (2019). She's the first solo female artist to have five albums sold over 100,000 units on Gaon Album Chart.

== Critical reception ==
Professional ratings
Review scores
Source	Rating
IZM	3/5 stars

Teen Vogue chose What Do I Call You as one of the "Best K-Pop Moments of 2020", with contributor Hannah Weiss writing: "With its chill soundscape and Taeyeon's airy vocals, What Do I Call You is the perfect soundtrack to close 2020. The album examines loneliness, desire and regret through a soft filter, sharing a touch of warmth to carry us through this winter".

Lim Seon-hee from IZM compared the EP's concepts to those of American singer Taylor Swift and its musical styles to Ariana Grande: "What Do I Call You is a collaboration of seasoned-ness and sincerity, with a wider range of emotions despite the method of 'removing away' without embellishment and excess. Now, no matter what genre she try, she can easily build a flagpole with her name inscribed. Beyond it all, the album becomes alive just by the deep touch of the voice that blows warm breath in the season of the bitter wind."

== Track listing ==
What Do I Call You – Digital edition
No.	Title	Lyrics	Music	Arrangement	Length
1.	"What Do I Call You"	Kenzie	Linnea Södahl; Caroline Pennell; David Pramik	David Pramik	2:47
2.	"Playlist"	Jeon Ji-eun (January 8th (lalala Studio)); Hwang Seon-jeong (January 8th (lalala Studio)); Kim Jeong-mi (January 8th (lalala Studio))	Mike Daley; Mitchell Owens; Nicole "Kole" Cohen	Mike Daley	2:43
3.	"To the Moon"	Taeyeon; Yorkie (Devine Channel); SOLE (Devine Channel)	Taeyeon; Im Kwang-wook (Devine Channel); Ryan Kim (Devine Channel); Andreas "Mage" Maggiani (Devine Channel); SOLE (Devine Channel); Sakehands	Devine Channel; Sakehands	2:42
4.	"Wildfire" (Korean: 들불)	Jo Yoon-kyung	Blaq Tuxedo	Blaq Tuxedo; Michael Jiminez; IMLAY	3:24
5.	"Galaxy"	Zaya (Joombas)	Mariella "Bambi" Garcia Balandina (Mr Radar); Mimmi Gyltman; MooF (Joombas)	MooF (Joombas)	3:46
Total length:					15:22

What Do I Call You – CD & LP edition
No.	Title	Lyrics	Music	Arrangement	Length
6.	"Happy"	Lee Seu-ran	Chris Wahle; Chelcee Grimes; Samuel Gerongco; Robert Gerongco	Chris Wahle	3:41
Total length:					19:03

== Personnel ==
Credits are adapted from Melon.

- S.M. Entertainment Co., Ltd. – executive producer
- Lee Soo-man – producer
- Vocal direction – G-High
- Pro Tools operation – G-High
- Background vocals – Choi Youngkyung, Chelcee Grimes and Gabriela Geneva (NIIVA)
- Bass guitar – Taeyun Lee
- Digital editing – Lee Min Kyu at SM Big Shot Studio / Kang Seonyoung at MonoTree Studio
- Engineer for mix – Lee Min Kyu at SM Big Shot Studio
- Recording – No Min Ji at SM Yellow Tail Studio / Kang Seonyoung at MonoTree Studio
- Mixing – Jung Eui Suk at SM Blue Cup Studio
- Mastering – Kwon Namwoo at 821 Sound Mastering

== Charts ==
=== Weekly charts ===
Weekly chart performance for What Do I Call You
Chart (2020)	Peak position
Japan Download Albums (Billboard Japan)	10
Japan Hot Albums (Billboard Japan)	48
South Korean Albums (Gaon)	4

=== Monthly charts ===
Monthly chart performance for What Do I Call You
Chart (2020)	Peak position
South Korean Albums (Gaon)	7
South Korean Albums (Gaon)	32

=== Year-end charts ===
Year-end chart performance for What Do I Call You
Chart (2020)	Peak position
South Korean Albums (Gaon)	83

== Sales ==
Sales for What Do I Call You
Region	Sales
China (digital)	59,961
South Korea (Gaon)	126,703 (Note: Sales combined with LP version (Original – 106,712, LP – 19,991))

== Accolades ==
Year	Awards	Category	Nominated work	Result
2020	12th Melon Music Awards	Best R&B/Soul	"Happy"	Nominated
2021	10th Gaon Chart Music Awards	Artist of the Year – Digital Music (May)	"Happy"	Nominated
2022	11th Gaon Chart Music Awards	Artist of the Year – Digital Music (December)	"What Do I Call You"	Won

Music program awards
Song	Program	Network	Date	Ref.
"What Do I Call You"	Inkigayo	SBS	December 27, 2020	

== Release history ==
Release history for What Do I Call You
Region	Date	Format	Label	Ref.
South Korea	December 15, 2020	CD; digital download; streaming	SM Entertainment; Dreamus	
Various	December 15, 2020	Digital download; streaming	SM Entertainment	
South Korea	February 25, 2021	LP	SM Entertainment; Dreamus	
