= Petkage =

2021 South Korean travel variety show

- Promotional poster
- Hangul: 펫키지
- RR: Petkiji
- MR: P'etk'iji
- Genre: Travel variety show
- Written by: Yang Ji-young
- Directed by: Kang Seong-woong
- Starring: Kim Tae-yeon; Kim Hee-chul; Hong Hyun-hee; Kang Ki-young
- Country of origin: South Korea
- Original language: Korean
- No. of episodes: 8

Original release
- Network: JTBC
- Release: August 26 – October 18, 2021

Petkage (Korean: 펫키지) is a South Korean travel variety show starring Kim Tae-yeon, Kim Hee-chul, Hong Hyun-hee, and Kang Ki-young. The teaser video was released on August 14, 2021. The show premiered on JTBC on August 26, 2021, and aired every Thursday at 22:30 (KST) for episode 1 to 6, and aired every Monday at 11:00 KST for episode 7 and 8.

== Synopsis ==
Petkage is a travel show in which the cast members and their dogs travel to various locations in South Korea. The cast members are free to choose their own destination, transportation, and itinerary.

== Cast ==
Main

- Kim Tae-yeon
- Kim Hee-chul
- Hong Hyun-hee
- Kang Ki-young

Guest

- Yoon Eun-hye (Ep. 2–4)
- Hong Seok-cheon (Ep. 4)
- Choi Yeo-jin (Ep. 5–6)
- Park Sung-kwang (Ep. 5–6)
- Lee Tae-sun (Ep. 5)
- Jun Jin (Ep. 7–8)
- Kim Jae-kyung (Ep. 7–8)

== Ratings ==
Average TV viewership ratings (nationwide)
Ep.	Original broadcast date	Average audience share (Nielsen Korea)
1	August 26, 2021	0.93% (37th)
2	September 2, 2021	0.54% (52nd)
3	September 9, 2021	0.54% (48th)
4	September 16, 2021	0.49% (53rd)
5	September 23, 2021	0.50% (48th)
6	September 30, 2021	0.55% (49th)
7	October 11, 2021	0.26% (61st)
8	October 18, 2021	0.22% (65th)
Average		0.50%
In the table above, the blue numbers represent the lowest ratings and the red numbers represent the highest ratings.; This series aired on a cable channel/pay TV which normally has a relatively smaller audience compared to free-to-air TV/public broadcasters (KBS, SBS, MBC and EBS).
