= What Do I Call You (song) =

2020 single by Taeyeon

Single by Taeyeon

from the EP What Do I Call You
- Released: December 15, 2020
- Genre: Pop; R&B
- Length: 2:47
- Label: SM
- Composers: Linnea Södahl; Caroline Pennell; David Pramik
- Lyricist: Kenzie

Taeyeon singles chronology
"My Love (Duet version)" (2020)	"What Do I Call You" (2020)	"Weekend" (2021)

Music video
- "What Do I Call You" on YouTube

"What Do I Call You" is a song recorded by South Korean singer Taeyeon. It was released on December 15, 2020, by SM Entertainment. The song's lyrics were penned by Kenzie while its music was composed by Linnea Södahl, Caroline Pennell, David Pramik and arranged by David Pramik. It is the title track of Taeyeon's fourth EP with the same name What Do I Call You.

== Background and release ==
On December 3, 2020, Taeyeon was announced to be releasing a mini album titled "What Do I Call You" and the title track with the same name. The song is described as a R&B pop that characterized by a minimalistic and rhythmic melody created by unique instruments. Its lyrics are about a girl with the lingering feelings for someone after a breakup.

"What Do I Call You" and its music video were released on December 15. In the music video, Taeyeon took inspiration from the 2004 movie Eternal Sunshine of the Spotless Mind as she attempted to forget memories of a certain. Taeyeon later filmed a live clip performance of the song, which was released on December 23. On January 1, 2021, Taeyeon performed "What Do I Call You" live for the first time at SMTOWN Live Culture Humanity online concert.

== Reception and accolades ==
Commercially, "What Do I Call You" debuted at number 14 on South Korea's Gaon Digital Chart for the chart issue dated December 13–19, 2020. It additionally peaked at number 15 on the Billboard K-pop Hot 100 chart.

"What Do I Call You" received a first place music program award on Inkigayo on December 27, 2020. At the 11th Gaon Chart Music Awards, it won best Digital Music – December.

== Credits and personnel ==
Credits are adapted from the CD booklet of What Do I Call You.

Studio

- SM Yellow Tail Studio – recording
- SM LVYIN Studio – digital editing
- SM SSAM Studio – engineered for mix
- SM Blue Ocean Studio – mixing
- 821 Sound – mastering

Personnel

- SM Entertainment – executive producer
- Lee Soo-man – producer
- Yoo Young-jin – music and sound supervisor
- Taeyeon – vocals, background vocals
- Kenzie – lyrics, vocal directing
- Linnea Södahl – composition
- Caroline Pennell – composition, background vocals
- David Pramik – composition, arrangement
- Noh Min-ji – recording
- Lee Ji-hong – digital editing
- Kang Eun-ji – engineered for mix
- Kim Cheol-sun – mixing
- Kwon Nam-woo – mastering

== Charts ==
=== Weekly charts ===
Chart	Peak position
South Korea (Gaon)	14
South Korea (K-pop Hot 100)	15

=== Monthly charts ===
Chart (2021)	Peak position
South Korea (Gaon)	46

=== Year-end chart ===
Chart (2021)	Position
South Korea (Gaon)	155

== Release history ==
Region	Date	Format	Label	Ref.
Various	December 15, 2020	Digital download, streaming	SM Entertainment	

== See also ==
- List of Inkigayo Chart winners (2020)
