= Jirisan (TV series) =

2021 South Korean television series

- Promotional poster
- Also known as: Cliffhanger; Mountain Jiri
- Hangul: 지리산
- Hanja: 智異山
- RR: Jirisan
- MR: Chirisan
- Genre: Mystery; Fantasy; Thriller; Drama
- Created by: Kim Je-hyeon (Studio Dragon)
- Written by: Kim Eun-hee
- Directed by: Lee Eung-bok
- Starring: Jun Ji-hyun; Ju Ji-hoon
- Narrated by: Ryu Seung-ryong
- Composer: Gaemi (Music manager)
- Country of origin: South Korea
- Original language: Korean
- No. of seasons: 1
- No. of episodes: 16

Production
- Executive producers: Joo Jae-hyun; Choi Ho-seong (CP); Kwak Ji-sang (CP)
- Producers: Lee Sang-baek; Kim Young-gyu; Park Ho-sik; Kim Ki-yoon; Jo Do-yeon
- Production location: Jirisan National Park
- Editor: Kim Woo-seol
- Running time: 60–90 minutes
- Production companies: AStory; Studio Dragon; Baram Pictures
- Budget: ₩32 billion (~US$27.4 million)

Original release
- Network: tvN
- Release: October 23 – December 12, 2021

Jirisan (Korean: 지리산) is a 2021 South Korean television series starring Jun Ji-hyun and Ju Ji-hoon. It is named after the eponymous mountain in South Korea and has been promoted as "tvN's 15th Anniversary Special Drama". It premiered on tvN on October 23 to December 12, 2021, and aired every Saturday and Sunday at 21:00 (KST). The series is available for streaming on iQIYI worldwide, and on Viki and Netflix in selected territories.

== Synopsis ==
Set against the backdrop of towering views of Jirisan, it depicts the story of rangers and other employees of the Jirisan National Park who climb through the mysterious and unexplored regions of the mountain, trying to rescue the survivors and lost trekkers. The drama is centered around a mystery surrounding the mountain's many visitors - those who come to kill, and those who come to end their lives.

== Cast and characters ==
=== Main ===
- Jun Ji-hyun as Seo Yi-kang
  - Kim Do-yeon as teenager Seo Yi-kang
  - Kang Ji-woo as young Seo Yi-kang

Nicknamed "Mountain Ghost God" and "Devil Seo" by her colleagues, she is the park's top ranger, who instinctively knows how to navigate the trails of the mountains. Her experience has made her knowledgeable enough to track down a lost hiker based on just a single leaf or blade of grass. In spite of this, she views the mountain as a dreadful place and has yearned to leave, but eventually stayed for her grandmother. Her cynical view of the mountain begins to change after she meets rookie ranger Hyun-jo, to whom she becomes a partner and confidante. She is 35-38 years old through the series.

- Ju Ji-hoon as Kang Hyun-jo

A military academy graduate who once rose to the rank of a captain. He harbors a deep secret that he cannot tell anyone. After encountering an incident on Mount Jiri, he began to see incomprehensible visions of deaths occurring on the mountain. Believing this is the mountain's calling for him to save them, he becomes a ranger. As he travels the mountains with senior ranger Yi-kang, they become true partners to the extent of entrusting each other with their own lives. He later discovers something terrifying hidden in Mount Jiri, and this begins to alter his view of the beautiful mountains, and the people there. He is 34-37 years old through the series.

=== Supporting ===
==== Haedong Branch and Bidam Shelter ====
- Sung Dong-il as Jo Dae-jin

The head of the branch office of the park who has spent most of his life working as a park ranger. He is honest to a fault and has a strong sense of duty for his job. Despite being widely respected as a ranger, he had failed to be there for his family when they needed him. His family eventually left him, and the mountain is all he is left with. So he further dedicates his life to rescuing others and sees the lives of his subordinates as his responsibility.

- Oh Jung-se as Jung Goo-young

An extremely realistic ranger who lives by the motto, "I need to take care of myself before I can take care of others". As such, he makes sure to take all his vacation days, does his job right on the clock and disappears right before he's dismissed. Under the surface, he has a good heart and has a deep camaraderie with the other rangers.

- Jo Han-chul as Park Il-hae, the ranger team leader.
- Joo Min-kyung as Lee Yang-sun
- Go Min-si as Lee Da-won, a rookie ranger.

==== North Jeolla Province Office ====
- Lee Ga-sub as Kim Sol, a park volunteer
- Joo Jin-mo as Kim Gye-hee
- Kim Gook-hee as Dr. Yoon Su-jin

==== People in Haedong Village ====
- Kim Young-ok as Lee Moon-ok, Yi-kang's grandmother and owner of a restaurant in the village.
- Jeon Seok-ho as Kim Woong-soon, a police officer.
- Han Dong-ho as Park Soon-kyung

=== Extended ===
- Yoon Ji-on as Se-wook
- Son Suk-ku as Lim Cheol-kyeong
  - Choi Hyun-wook as teenager Lim Cheol-kyeong

=== Special appearances ===
- Park Hwan-hee as Hee-won, climber visiting Jirisan National Park.
- Seo Hye-won as Hong Young-mi
- Kim Min-ho as Kim Ki-chang
- Ryu Seung-ryong as Narrator
- Ye Soo-jung as Geum-ri
- Lee Chae-kyung as Il-man's wife, the president of a health center who makes a living by illegally catching snakes.
- Choi Go as Il-man's son and his mother is the president of a health center.
- Gong Sung-ha as Jung Soo-min
- Ji Seung-hyun as Kim Nam-sik, former ranger of Jirisan National Park.
- Yoon Jong-suk as Tae-joo
- Jo Wan-ki as Kim Jae-gyeom
- Lee Sun-bin as Kang Seung-ah, Kang Hyun-jo's sister.
- Kim Kap-soo as Kang Oh-hyeon, Kang Hyun-jo's father.
- Nam Gi-ae as Lee Hyun-sook, Kang Hyun-jo's mother.

== Production ==
=== Development ===
Jirisan is created by director Lee Eung-bok and writer Kim Eun-hee. Writer Kim Eun-hee based the story of Jirisan on her interviews with national park workers. Kim said in an interview, "When I wrote Jirisan at the beginning, it didn't focus on rangers. I was more interested in stories about mountaineers. However, I was more intrigued about their work after interviewing them."

=== Casting ===
On March 3, 2020, it was reported that Jun Ji-hyun was in talks to star in Kim Eun-hee's new television series. On September 4, it was officially confirmed that Jun would star alongside Ju Ji-hoon. Sung Dong-il and Oh Jung-se officially joined the main cast on September 10.

=== Filming ===
Principal photography for the drama began on September 18, 2020, at Sannae-myun in Namwon, Jeonbuk. The first outdoor shoot was held on October 29. Production was halted from December 8 to 20 due to the rise in COVID-19 cases in South Korea. Filming was completed in June 2021. Jirisan is the first television series to be filmed at Jirisan National Park.

=== Broadcasting ===
Jirisan was filmed with a budget of ₩32 billion (~US$27.4 million). In 2020, iQIYI attained its overseas distribution rights for over ₩25 billion, around 80% of the production costs. On September 25, 2021, tvN announced the series would air from October 23, on Saturdays and Sundays at 21:00 (KST).

== Original soundtrack ==
Jirisan

Soundtrack album by Various Artists
- Released: 2021
- Genre: Soundtrack
- Languages: Korean; English
- Labels: Dreamus; AStory; MOST CONTENTS

All credits were adapted from Melon.

=== Part 1 ===
Released on October 24, 2021
No.	Title	Lyrics	Music	Artist	Length
1.	"Destiny"	Lee Jun-hwa	Gaemi; Lee Jun-hwa	Kim Feel	3:37
2.	"Destiny" (Inst.)		Gaemi; Lee Jun-hwa		3:37
Total length:					7:14

=== Part 2 ===
Released on October 30, 2021
No.	Title	Lyrics	Music	Artist	Length
1.	"Memories"	Gaemi; Lee Jun-hwa	Gaemi; Lee Jun-hwa	Gaho	3:26
2.	"Memories" (Inst.)		Gaemi; Lee Jun-hwa		3:26
Total length:					6:52

=== Part 3 ===
Released on November 6, 2021
No.	Title	Lyrics	Music	Artist	Length
1.	"Falling" (시간의 틈 사이로)	Shim Hyeon-bo	Gaemi	Kim Jong-wan (Nell)	4:00
2.	"Falling" (Inst.)		Gaemi		4:00
Total length:					8:00

=== Part 4 ===
Released on November 7, 2021
No.	Title	Lyrics	Music	Artist	Length
1.	"Yours"	Gaemi; JIDA	Gaemi	Jin (BTS)	4:24
2.	"Yours" (Inst.)		Gaemi		4:24
Total length:					8:49

=== Part 5 ===
Released on November 14, 2021
No.	Title	Lyrics	Music	Artist	Length
1.	"In Color" (물들인다)	Gadeul	Gaemi; Park Jeong-hwan	Lee So-ra	3:49
2.	"In Color" (Inst.)		Gaemi; Park Jeong-hwan		3:49
Total length:					7:38

=== Part 6 ===
Released on November 20, 2021
No.	Title	Lyrics	Music	Artist	Length
1.	"Stay"	JIDA	Gaemi	O3ohn	3:40
2.	"Stay" (Inst.)		Gaemi		3:40
Total length:					7:21

=== Part 7 ===
Released on November 21, 2021
No.	Title	Lyrics	Music	Artist	Length
1.	"Our Road"	Gadeul	Gaemi	Rothy	3:41
2.	"Our Road" (Inst.)		Gaemi		3:41
Total length:					7:22

=== Part 8 ===
Released on November 28, 2021
No.	Title	Lyrics	Music	Artist	Length
1.	"Little Garden" (나의 작은 정원)	Lee Joo-hyeong (MonoTree)	Gaemi; Lee Joo-hyeong (MonoTree); Jun.p (MonoTree)	Taeyeon	4:09
2.	"Little Garden" (Inst.)		Gaemi; Lee Joo-hyeong (MonoTree); Jun.p (MonoTree)		4:09
Total length:					8:18

=== Part 9 ===
Released on December 4, 2021
No.	Title	Lyrics	Music	Artist	Length
1.	"Always With You" (늘 곁에서 지금처럼)	Paul Kim	Gaemi	Paul Kim	3:26
2.	"Always With You" (Inst.)		Gaemi		3:26
Total length:					6:52

=== Part 10 ===
Released on December 5, 2021
No.	Title	Lyrics	Music	Artist	Length
1.	"I′m Coming Home"	Gaemi; Gadeul	Gaemi	Jukjae	4:06
2.	"I′m Coming Home" (Inst.)		Gaemi		4:06
Total length:					8:12

=== Part 11 ===
Released on December 11, 2021
No.	Title	Lyrics	Music	Artist	Length
1.	"Valley of the Shadow"	Kim Eana	Gaemi	Lee Seung-yeol	3:38
2.	"Valley of the Shadow" (Inst.)		Gaemi		3:38
Total length:					7:16

=== Part 12 ===
Released on December 12, 2021
No.	Title	Music	Artist	Length
1.	"Harmony of Leaves"	Gaemi; Leto	Henry feat. Park Jin-woo	3:28
Total length:				3:28

== Viewership ==
A 9.1% viewership rating was recorded nationwide for the series' first episode, making it the highest premiere rating on the network for a series on its first season, and the second overall after Hospital Playlist 2.

Jirisan : South Korea viewers per episode (millions)

Season	Episode number																Average
Season	1	2	3	4	5	6	7	8	9	10	11	12	13	14	15	16	Average
1	2.320	2.586	1.973	2.174	1.951	2.124	1.938	1.974	1.856	2.027	1.743	2.003	1.787	1.900	1.829	2.284	2.029

Source: Audience measurement performed nationwide by Nielsen Korea

Average TV viewership ratings
Ep.	Original broadcast date	Average audience share (Nielsen Korea)	
Ep.	Original broadcast date	Nationwide	Seoul
1	October 23, 2021	9.097% (1st)	9.671% (1st)
2	October 24, 2021	10.663% (1st)	12.226% (1st)
3	October 30, 2021	7.850% (1st)	8.141% (1st)
4	October 31, 2021	9.384% (1st)	10.348% (1st)
5	November 6, 2021	7.966% (1st)	8.055% (1st)
6	November 7, 2021	8.922% (1st)	9.507% (1st)
7	November 13, 2021	7.870% (1st)	8.476% (1st)
8	November 14, 2021	7.908% (1st)	9.076% (1st)
9	November 20, 2021	7.762% (1st)	8.467% (1st)
10	November 21, 2021	8.261% (1st)	9.054% (1st)
11	November 27, 2021	7.562% (1st)	8.009% (1st)
12	November 28, 2021	8.105% (1st)	8.656% (1st)
13	December 4, 2021	7.741% (1st)	8.978% (1st)
14	December 5, 2021	8.212% (1st)	8.626% (1st)
15	December 11, 2021	7.636% (1st)	8.243% (1st)
16	December 12, 2021	9.225% (1st)	10.114% (1st)
Average		8.385%	9.103%
In the table above, the blue numbers represent the lowest ratings and the red numbers represent the highest ratings.; This drama airs on a cable channel/pay TV which normally has a relatively smaller audience compared to free-to-air TV/public broadcasters (KBS, SBS, MBC and EBS).
