= Why (Taeyeon song) =

Single by Taeyeon

from the EP Why
- Released: June 28, 2016
- Genre: EDM; electropop; R&B; tropical house
- Length: 3:27
- Label: SM
- Composers: LDN Noise; Lauren Dyson; Rodnae "Chikk" Bell
- Lyricist: Jo Yoon-kyung
- Producer: LDN Noise

Taeyeon singles chronology
"Starlight" (2016)	"Why" (2016)	"11:11" (2016)

"Why" is a song recorded by South Korean singer Taeyeon for her second extended play of the same name. It was released as the EP's second single on June 28, 2016 by SM Entertainment. The song's lyrics were penned by Jo Yoon-kyung, while its music was composed and arranged by LDN Noise, Lauren Dyson, and Rodnae "Chikk" Bell. Musically, as opposed to Taeyeon's signature balladic styles, "Why" is described as a hybrid of EDM and R&B with elements of tropical house. The track's lyrics address a desire to escape a suffocating life.

The single received positive reviews from music critics, who were favorable towards the song's refreshing musical styles as well as Taeyeon's vocal performance. Commercially, "Why" peaked at number seven on South Korea's Gaon Digital Chart and reached number six on the Billboard World Digital Songs chart. As of December 2016, the song has sold 689,209 digital units in South Korea.

Two music videos for the song were released; the first one was directed by Im Seong-gwan and was premiered simultaneously with the release of the single. Filmed in California, the video depicts Taeyeon going on a trip to re-energize herself. The second one–a dance version featuring Taeyeon performing the choreography to the song was released on July 4, 2016. To promote "Why", Taeyeon held an event called "Countdown Night" prior to the song's release on Naver's V app. She also appeared and performed on music shows including Music Bank, Show! Music Core, and Inkigayo. The song was also included on the setlist of Taeyeon's concert Butterfly Kiss in South Korea in July and August 2016.

== Background and release ==
Taeyeon made her official debut as a solo singer in October 2015 with her first extended play I, which peaked at number two on South Korea's Gaon Album Chart and has sold over 140,000 physical copies in the country. Following the success of I, Taeyeon released a single for S.M. Entertainment's digital music platform SM Station titled "Rain", which was a number-one hit on South Korea's Gaon Digital Chart. As her popularity consolidated, S.M. Entertainment announced on June 17, 2016 that Taeyeon's second extended play Why would be released on June 28. The EP was an instant success in South Korea, exceeding pre-order sales of 102,598 copies, and went on to debut atop the Gaon Album Chart.

Why yielded two singles; the first one was "Starlight" featuring alternative R&B singer Dean; it was released on June 25, 2016 by S.M. Entertainment. "Why" was the second single after "Starlight", being made available for digital download three days after the release of the lead single. The song impacted Korean Broadcasting System radio on June 29, 2016. According to the liner notes of the EP, the lyrics of "Why" were written by Jo Yoon-kyung, while its music was composed by LDN Noise, Lauren Dyson, and Rodnae "Chikk" Bell.

== Music and lyrics ==
"Why"
"Why" is a hybrid of EDM and R&B with tropical house inspirations

As opposed to Taeyeon's signature balladic styles, "Why" was described as a hybrid of "trendy" EDM and R&B. Chester Chin from Malaysian magazine The Star characterized the track as a tropical house-inspired song instrumented by "twirling" synthesizers and electronic beats. Jeff Benjamin writing for Fuse wrote that "Why" featured "sparse guitar drums" and a "woozy" tropical house beat, and likened the song's musical styles to those of DJ Snake's single "Middle" (2015). Writing for Billboard, Benjamin and Jessica Oak described the song as an electropop track. In an episode of Pops in Seoul broadcast by Arirang TV on July 12, 2016, Taeyeon herself described "Why" as a tropical house song that would "make you feel refreshed and want to dance," which she thought of as a suitable tune for the summer. The track's lyrics detail a desire to escape from a suffocating life to re-energize oneself. Moon Wang-sik from Star News also noted a hesitancy in the dream of a "sudden escape from everyday's life":

If I leave now, Good, Good, Good, yeah
Everything I meet is going to be Great, Great, yeah
With a lighter heart, Work, Work, baby
It is already in front of me
But I am hesitating, Why (Note: Original Hangul lyrics: 지금 떠난다면 Good, Good, Good, yeah 만나게 될 모든 건 Great, Great, yeah 가벼워진 맘이 Work, Work, baby 이미 이미 눈 앞에 아른아른대는데 망설여 Why)

== Reception ==
"Why" received generally favorable reviews from music critics. Chester Chin from The Star noted the "180 degree shift" in the song's musical styles as a departure from Taeyeon's signature sound, describing the track as a "neon-coloured" song that played as "a progressive evolution" rather than "simply emulating" a more Americanized sound. He also praised the song's instrumentation as showcasing Taeyeon as "an incredibly dynamic performer." Jeff Benjamin writing for Fuse lauded "Why" as "an ornament for Taeyeon's powerhouse vocals" with "precise harmonies and an emotional punch" that was deemed as unusual for a typical EDM release. Korea JoongAng Daily's Lee Seo-jin dubbed the single as "refreshing", while Go Jae-wan from The Chosun Ilbo was enthusiastic towards the track's musical styles as well as Taeyeon's "cool" vocals that would make the song "blow off the heat this summer."

Commercially, "Why" was Taeyeon's first to fail to enter the top five of the Gaon Digital Chart since her solo career began in 2015. The track debuted at number seven on the chart issue dated June 26 – July 2, 2016. The following week, it dropped to number nine on the chart. "Why" was the thirteenth best-performing song of July 2016 on the Gaon Digital Chart, based on digital sales, streaming, and instrumental track downloads. As of December 2016, "Why" has sold 689,209 digital copies in South Korea. On the World Digital Songs, a chart published by Billboard, "Why" debuted at number seven on the chart issue dated July 16, 2016; the following week, it rose to number six, which later became its peak position on the chart. The single remained on the chart for six weeks before dropping out of the chart on the chart issue dated August 27, 2016.

== Music videos ==
There are two accompanying music videos for "Why". The original video, directed by Im Seong-gwan, premiered simultaneously with the release of the single. Its synopsis follows the lyrical content of the song, depicting Taeyeon as the protagonist who desires to escape a suffocating life to re-energize herself. The filming location was decided by Taeyeon herself to be California; the singer explained on Pops of Seoul, "I wanted to choose a location where I had created wonderful memories before. When it comes to a liberal, cool, sunny and beautiful place, LA [sic] comes to mind first, and that's why." Jeff Benjamin from Fuse wrote that the video "showcases a new side of Taeyeon" while praising the singer's "fierce" fashion style, notably Moschino crop tops and a flannel shirt plastered with the phrase "Queen of Beers." Echoing Benjamin's viewpoint, Susan Min of CJ E&M expressed: "Taeyeon shows a side of her that we′ve never seen before [...] with condiments especially catches the eye."

A dance version was released on July 4, 2016. Set to the backdrop of bright colors and flashing lights, the video focuses on Taeyeon's dancing skills and features choreography created for the song. An editor from BNT news commented that Taeyeon's performance would "satisfy the global fans’ needs," while Australian network Special Broadcasting Service deemed the choreography as "seriously impressive" that "definitely required quite a bit of practice."

== Promotion ==
Prior to the song and the EP's release, on June 27, 2016, Taeyeon held a live event called "Countdown Night" on Naver's V app, introducing songs from the album and communicating with her fans. Following the release of the EP, the singer performed the title track "Why" on three music programs: KBS2's Music Bank on July 1, MBC's Show! Music Core on July 2, and SBS's Inkigayo on July 3. On July 10, the single achieved the top spot on Inkigayo, based on digital sales, physical sales (album sales), YouTube view count, and viewers' vote count; Taeyeon however did not attend the show on that day due to schedule conflict. To further promote the EP, Taeyeon embarked on a series of concerts titled Butterfly Kiss. The concert took place in Seoul at Olympic Park on July 9–10, 2016, and in Busan at the KBS Hall on August 6–7, 2016. "Why" was included on the setlist of the show, which consisted of 22 songs in total.

== Accolades ==
Music program award
Program	Date	Ref.
Inkigayo (SBS)	July 10, 2016	

== Credits and personnel ==
Credits are adapted from the CD liner notes of Why.

Studio

- SM Yellow Tail Studio – recording, mixing
- SM Blue Ocean Studio – recording
- MonoTree Studio – additional vocal editing
- Sterling Sound – mastering

Personnel

- SM Entertainment – executive producer
- Lee Soo-man – producer
- Taeyeon – vocals
- Jo Yoon-kyung – lyrics
- LDN Noise – producer, composition, arrangement
- Lauren Dyson – composition, arrangement, background vocals
- Rodnae "Chikk" Bell – composition, arrangement
- Yoo Shin-hye – background vocals
- G-High – vocal directing, Pro Tools operating, additional vocal editing
- Koo Jong-pil – recording, mixing
- Kim Cheol-sun – recording
- Tom Coyne – mastering

== Charts ==
=== Weekly charts ===
Chart (2016)	Peak position
South Korea (Gaon)	7
US World Digital Songs (Billboard)	6

=== Year-end chart ===
Chart (2016)	Position
South Korea (Gaon)	100

== See also ==
- List of Inkigayo Chart winners (2016)
