= All About You (Taeyeon song) =

Single by Taeyeon

from the album Hotel del Luna OST
- Released: July 21, 2019
- Recorded: 2019
- Studio: SM Yellow Tail Studio
- Length: 3:29
- Label: YamYam Entertainment
- Songwriters: Park Se-joon; Ji Hoon; minGtion
- Producers: Song Dong-woon; minGtion

Taeyeon singles chronology
"Four Seasons" (2019)	"All About You" (2019)	"Spark" (2019)

"All About You" (Korean: 그대라는 시; RR: Geudaeraneun si; lit. '"A Poem Named For You"') is a song recorded by South Korean singer Taeyeon for the soundtrack of the 2019 drama series Hotel del Luna. It was released as a digital single on July 21, 2019, by YAMYAM Entertainment, under license by Dreamus.

The single topped South Korea's Gaon Digital Chart for two consecutive weeks, and reached number two on the Korea K-Pop Hot 100 chart. It was nominated for Best OST at the 12th Korea Drama Awards, and won OST Award at the 2020 Seoul Music Awards.

== Background ==
On July 9, 2019, YAMYAM Entertainment confirmed that Taeyeon would be among the singers to record the soundtrack for the drama series Hotel Del Luna. This marked the first time Taeyeon released a soundtrack recording after three years, following "All with You" for Moon Lovers: Scarlet Heart Ryeo (2016). The song, titled "그대라는 시" (literally "A Poem Titled You") in Korean and "All About You" in English, was produced by Song Dong-woon, who had previously produced the soundtracks for hit dramas such as Descendants of the Sun and Goblin: The Lonely and Great God. "All About You" was released on July 21, 2019, as a digital single by YAMYAM Entertainment, under license by Dreamus.

== Reception ==
"All About You" debuted atop the Gaon Digital Chart dated July 21–27, 2019. It remained on the top spot for one further week and ranked second on the Gaon Monthly Digital Chart for August 2019. Overall, "All About You" spent nine weeks in the top ten. It placed at number 31 on the year-end chart, ranking 55th in terms of sales and 32nd in terms of streaming.

Lee Seung-mi of The Chosun Ilbo commented that the "delicate" piano melody and Taeyeon's "refined" vocals created a mysterious charm that complemented the themes of the drama. Hwang Hye-jin from South Korean news portal Newsen commented that the commercial success of "All About You" brought back the "OST fever" that last happened in 2017 with the soundtrack of Goblin, particularly Ailee's "I Will Go to You Like the First Snow". Hwang also praised Taeyeon's emotional voice and the "exquisite" piano that gave the song a grieving atmosphere.

== Track listing ==
Digital download and streaming

1. "All About You" — 3:29
2. "All About You" (Instrumental) – 3:29

== Credits and personnel ==
Credits adapted from Melon.

Studio

- SM Yellow Tail Studio – recording
- Doobdoob Studio – mixing
- Suono – mastering

Personnel

- YamYam Entertainment – executive producer
- Song Dong-woon – producer
- Taeyeon – vocals
- Park Se-joon – lyrics
- Ji Hoon – lyrics
- minGtion – producer, composition, arrangement, piano, digital editing
- Emily Yeonseo Kim – vocal directing
- Koo Jong-pil – recording
- Kim Hyun-gon – mixing
- Choi Hyo-young – mastering

== Charts ==
=== Weekly charts ===
Weekly chart performance for "All About You"
Chart (2019)	Peak position
South Korea (Gaon)	1
South Korea (K-Pop Hot 100)	2

=== Year-end charts ===
2019 Year-end chart performance for "All About You"
Chart (2019)	Position
South Korea (Gaon Digital Chart)	31

2020 Year-end chart performance for "All About You"
Chart (2020)	Position
South Korea (Gaon Digital Chart)	102

== Certifications and sales ==
Region	Certification	Certified units/sales
Streaming
South Korea (KMCA)	Platinum	100,000,000^{†}
^{†} Streaming-only figures based on certification alone.

== Awards and nominations ==
Year	Award	Category	Result	Ref.
2019	12th Korea Drama Awards	Best OST	Nominated	
2020	29th Seoul Music Awards	OST Award	Won	

Melon Popularity Award
Award	Date	Ref.
Weekly Popularity Award	August 5, 2019	
Weekly Popularity Award	August 12, 2019	
Weekly Popularity Award	August 19, 2019	
Weekly Popularity Award	August 26, 2019	
Weekly Popularity Award	September 2, 2019	

== See also ==
- List of Gaon Digital Chart number ones of 2019
- List of certified songs in South Korea
