= Taeyeon =

South Korean singer (born 1989)

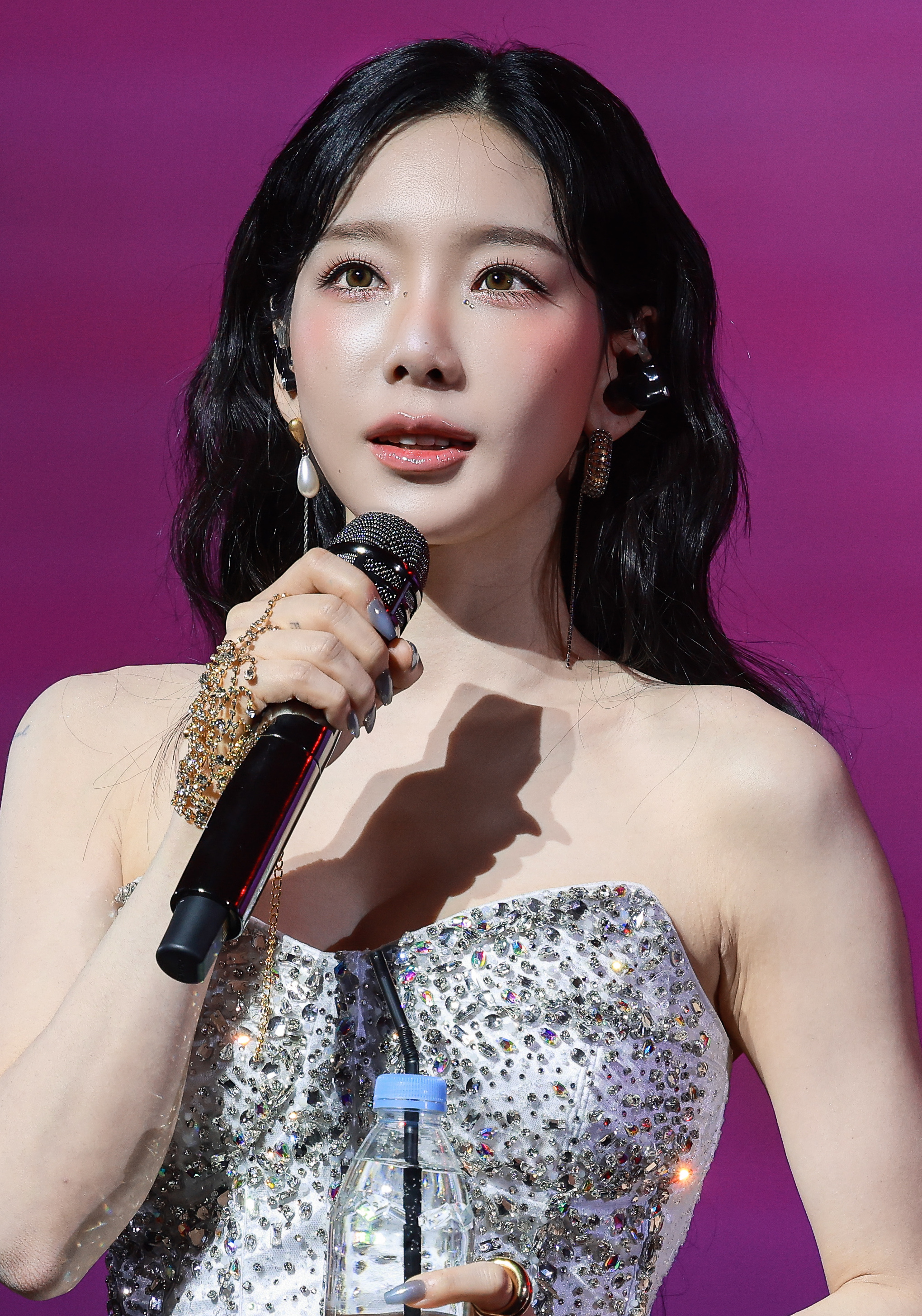
- Taeyeon in 2025
- Born: Kim Tae-yeon; March 9, 1989 (age 37); Jeonju, South Korea
- Occupation: Singer
- Musical career
- Genres: K-pop; pop rock; R&B; soul
- Instrument: Vocals
- Years active: 2007–present
- Labels: SM; Universal Japan
- Member of: Girls' Generation; Girls' Generation-TTS; Girls' Generation-Oh!GG; Got the Beat
- Website: Official website

Korean name
- Hangul: 김태연
- RR: Gim Taeyeon
- MR: Kim T'aeyŏn

Signature
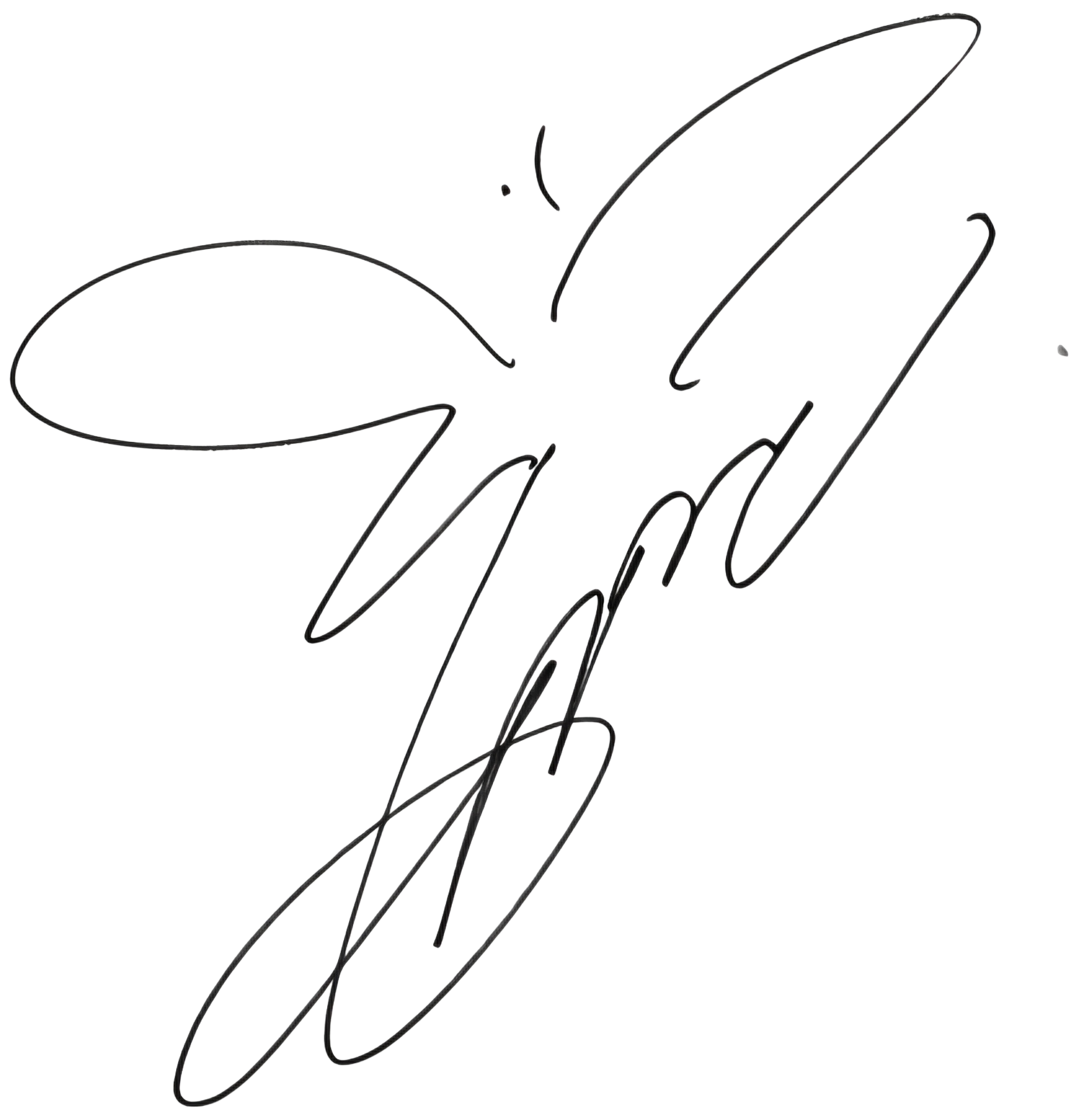

Kim Tae-yeon (Korean: 김태연; born March 9, 1989), known mononymously as Taeyeon, is a South Korean singer. She debuted as a member of girl group Girls' Generation in August 2007, which went on to become one of the best-selling artists in South Korea and one of the most widely known K-pop groups worldwide. She has since participated in other SM Entertainment projects, including Girls' Generation-TTS, SM the Ballad, Girls' Generation-Oh!GG, and the supergroup Got the Beat.

In 2015, Taeyeon released her debut extended play (EP) I, whose titular single reached number one on South Korea's Gaon Digital Chart. In 2016, she released the number-one single "Rain" as part of the SM Station project, followed by her second EP Why, which peaked atop the Gaon Album Chart. Taeyeon's debut studio album, My Voice, was released in 2017 and yielded the top-five singles "11:11", "Fine" and "Make Me Love You". Taeyeon ventured into the Japanese music scene in 2018 with the digital single "Stay", followed by the 2019 EP Voice. Her second studio album, Purpose (2019), featured the number-one single "Four Seasons" and the top-5 single "Spark". Her third studio album INVU (2022) included the number-one titular single as well as top-10 singles "Weekend" and "Can't Control Myself".

On television, Taeyeon appeared on the reality shows We Got Married (2009) and Begin Again (2019) and hosted Queendom 2 (2022). She is currently a cast member of Amazing Saturday (2020–present). Additionally, Taeyeon has recorded soundtracks for various television dramas and films, including "If" for Hong Gil-dong (2008), "Can You Hear Me" for Beethoven Virus (2008), and the chart-topping "All About You" for Hotel del Luna (2019).

Having sold over one million physical albums and twenty million digital singles as of 2021, Taeyeon is one of the best-selling solo artists in South Korea. She has received various awards and nominations, including seven Golden Disc Awards, six Seoul Music Awards, five Circle Chart Music Awards, four Melon Music Awards, and four Mnet Asian Music Awards.

== Life and career ==
=== 1989–2008: Early life and career beginnings ===
Taeyeon was born on March 9, 1989, in Wansan District, Jeonju, South Korea. Her family consists of her parents, an older brother, and a younger sister Kim Hayeon, who made her solo debut in 2020. Having believed that she was "only talented" at singing, Taeyeon first dreamed of becoming a singer at a young age. During her second year in middle school, Taeyeon accompanied her father to SM Academy, a former music institution and auxiliary affiliation of SM Entertainment, to pursue vocal lessons. Although at the time her father did not encourage Taeyeon to become an entertainer, he was persuaded by the school's principal to give his daughter a chance after she recognized Taeyeon's "clean" voice. During the next year, Taeyeon accompanied her father from their hometown to Seoul every Sunday to receive vocal lessons from The One. She named BoA, Whitney Houston and Hikaru Utada as her pre-debut inspirations.

Taeyeon trained under The One for three years. In a 2011 interview, he described Taeyeon as a "smart" student, someone "unlike others who came to him with dreams of becoming a celebrity... [she] wanted to be a singer and reach the top with her own talents." In 2004, he "wanted to acknowledge Taeyeon's potential" by giving her the chance to be in his song "You Bring Me Joy". That same year, she won first place at the SM Youth Best Competition and signed a contract with SM Entertainment. The training process was so tough that she almost quit at one point; she persisted, however, and debuted as a member of girl group Girls' Generation in August 2007. Both the president of SM Academy and The One later named Taeyeon as one of their most memorable students. Taeyeon graduated from Jeonju Art High School and was awarded the school's Lifetime Achievement Award in 2008.

=== 2008–2015: Original soundtracks, TTS and SM The Ballad ===
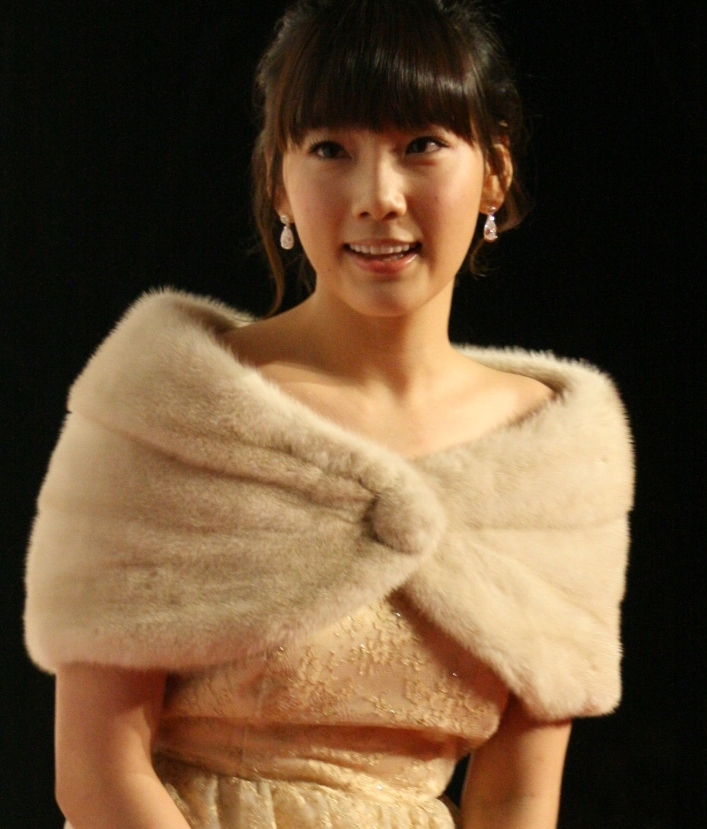
Taeyeon in 2008

Taeyeon sang "7989" (featuring Kangta), a track from both Girls' Generation's eponymous debut album (2007) and Kangta's fourth studio album, Eternity (2008). Taeyeon began to gain popularity through her various television soundtrack releases, recording "If" for the KBS2 drama Hong Gil Dong (2008) and "Can You Hear Me" for MBC's drama Beethoven Virus (2008). "If" was later deemed more popular than its respective drama, and "Can You Hear Me" won a Popularity Award at the 2008 Golden Disk Awards. Both tracks remain among Taeyeon's most well-known hits. During this period, she also recorded "It's Love", a duet with Girls' Generation member Sunny, for the MBC drama Heading to the Ground (2009).

Following a radio hosting job in 2009–10, Taeyeon journeyed into acting, making her theatrical debut in a lead role in the 2010 musical A Song to the Sun. She played the part of Kaoru Amane, a teenager who suffered from xeroderma pigmentosum, and learned to play a guitar for the role. Her performance in the sold-out shows received good press despite the musical's critical reviews of the musical itself. Jang Gyeong-jin of 10Asia praised Taeyeon's "distinct vocals" and commented that her acting stood out among idol stars who had ventured into musical theatre, while Kim Ji-yeong from The Dong-A Ilbo felt "Taeyeon's optimistic and charming personality made her the perfect match" for the role. Despite the favorable response, Taeyeon later described musicals as difficult, stating that her weak concentration made it hard for her to act and sing at the same time.

The same year, Taeyeon worked with Korean songwriter-composer Ahn Young-min. She recorded "Like A Star", featuring The One, which reached number one on the Gaon Digital Chart. Her next single, "I Love You", for the SBS drama Athena: Goddess of War soundtrack, reached number two. Ahn recalled his impression of the latter song: "I was surprised at how well Taeyeon could sing. This is a rather mature song, so I would be lying if I said I didn't have my doubts, but she blew me away. I was moved to tears listening to her singing." In 2011, Taeyeon lent her voice to Kim Bum-soo's "Different", a single on his seventh album Solista: Part 2. The song debuted at number two on the Gaon Digital Chart. Taeyeon and Kim Bum-soo reunited at his concert two years later for a live cover version of the latter's 2008 song "Man and Woman".

After their first collaboration on the drama Beethoven Virus (2008), musical director Lee Pil-ho was determined to collaborate with Taeyeon again on the soundtrack for MBC's melodrama The King 2 Hearts (2012), having her record the main theme song "Missing You Like Crazy". It was released in March 2012 and debuted at number two on both the Gaon Digital Chart and K-pop Hot 100. Taeyeon's vocals received positive feedback from the song's composer Park Hae-woon: "She fully understood the song in its entirety and expressed each detail very precisely...even though this song requires the lowest note that a female singer can produce, Taeyeon executed them perfectly." The song was named the most popular soundtrack at 2012 Seoul Drama Awards. Later in the year, she contributed vocals to the song "Closer", for the SBS drama To the Beautiful You, which charted at number seven on both the Gaon Digital Chart and K-pop Hot 100.

In April 2012, a subgroup of Girls' Generation called TTS was formed, its lineup consisting of Taeyeon, Tiffany and Seohyun. Their debut EP, Twinkle, was met with much success and became South Korea's eighth-highest selling album of the year. The subgroup went on to release two more EPs: Holler (2014) and Dear Santa (2015). In January 2013, Taeyeon and Tiffany sang a duet, "Lost in Love", which was featured on Girls' Generation's fourth Korean album, I Got a Boy. Two months later, she recorded "And One", written and composed by Kangta, for the SBS drama That Winter, the Wind Blows. It debuted at the top of Billboard's K-pop Hot 100 and reached number two on the Gaon Digital Chart. In July 2013, Taeyeon was invited to record the theme song "Bye" for the soundtrack of the film Mr. Go after its musical director was left with a "deep impression" having heard her cover version of a song during a radio appearance.

In February 2014, Taeyeon joined the roster of SM the Ballad, a ballad group initially formed by SM Entertainment in 2010, contributing vocals to their second album Breath. Her lead single of the same name, a duet with Shinee's Jonghyun, peaked at number three and six on South Korea's Gaon Digital Chart and K-pop Hot 100 Chart, respectively. She also recorded a solo song, "Set Me Free", for the album. Her other releases in 2014 included "Colorful" for JTBC's campaign "The World Is More Beautiful Because We're Different" and "Love, That One Word" for the SBS's drama You're All Surrounded; the latter entered Top 10 on both Gaon Digital Chart and K-Pop Hot 100. In February 2015, Taeyeon accepted a personal request from f(x)'s Amber to feature in "Shake that Brass", the lead single from her debut album, Beautiful.

=== 2015–2016: Solo debut and first solo concert ===
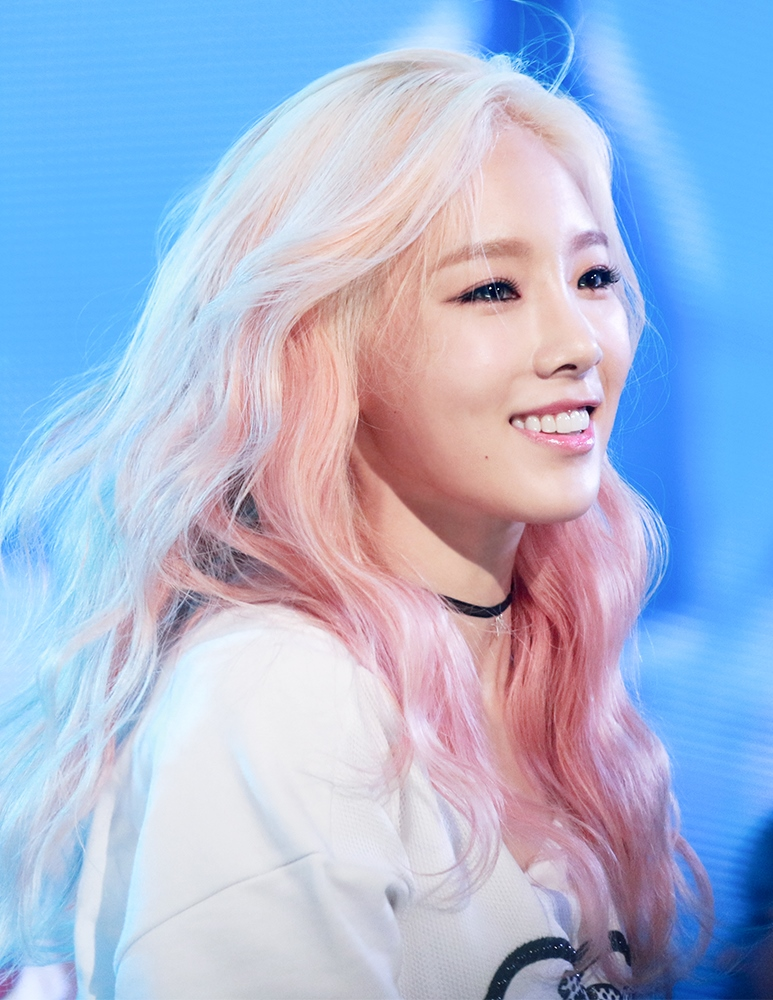
Taeyeon in July 2015

Taeyeon began working on her solo projects in late 2014, believing the "right time" had come after eight years with Girls' Generation. She released her debut extended play (EP), I, in October 2015. It peaked at number two on South Korea's Gaon Album Chart, and charted atop the US Billboard World Albums. As of 2019, it has sold 160,000 copies in South Korea. The commercial success of I, according to Yonhap News Agency, was the main contributor to SM Entertainment's leading music sales in the fourth quarter of 2015. The title track, which features rapper Verbal Jint, incorporated elements of pop rock that marked a departure from the ballad sound she had been known for until then. The song peaked at number one in South Korea, where it has sold over 2.5 million digital units. To accompany her solo release, Taeyeon held a series of small concerts called Taeyeon's Very Special Day, and a reality show, OnStyle's Daily Taeng9Cam. She was awarded Best Female Artist at the 2015 Mnet Asian Music Awards and at the 2016 Golden Disk Awards.

Taeyeon featured on Yim Jae-beom's "Scars Deeper than Love" (2015), Verbal Jint's "If The World Was a Perfect Place" (2015), and Crush's "Don't Forget" (2016). "Don't Forget" sold over 2.5 million copies in South Korea. In February 2016, she recorded "Rain" as the inaugural release of SM Entertainment's digital music platform SM Station. "Rain" peaked at number one in South Korea, where it sold over 2.5 million digital copies. Taeyeon and Super Junior's Kyuhyun were featured in a commercial for bottled water brand Jeju Samdasoo, for which she recorded a cover of "The Blue Night of Jeju Island". She also became a spokesperson for Sword and Magic, a game developed by the company Longtu Korea, for which she recorded a rendition of BoA's 2003 song "Atlantis Princess".

Taeyeon's second EP, Why (2016), incorporated elements of more upbeat genres such as EDM and tropical house. It peaked atop the Gaon Album Chart, and charted at number two on the US Billboard World Albums. The EP has sold 120,000 copies as of 2019. It spawned two singles: "Starlight" featuring Dean and the title track, which peaked at numbers five and seven, respectively, in South Korea. The EP's associated concert, Butterfly Kiss, made Taeyeon the first Korean female artist to embark on a full-scale concert while still being a member of an active girl group. In September 2016, Taeyeon recorded "All With You" for SBS's television drama Moon Lovers: Scarlet Heart Ryeo. Her next single, "11:11", was released in November 2016. It peaked at number two on the Gaon Digital Chart and sold 1.4 million copies by 2017. Billboard ranked it the seventh best K-pop song of 2016. The Dong-a Ilbo in December 2016 named Taeyeon as "Voice of the Year", "Singer of the Year", and "Most Hardworking". At the 2016 Mnet Asian Music Awards, Taeyeon was awarded Best Female Artist.

=== 2017–2019: My Voice, Japanese debut and Purpose ===
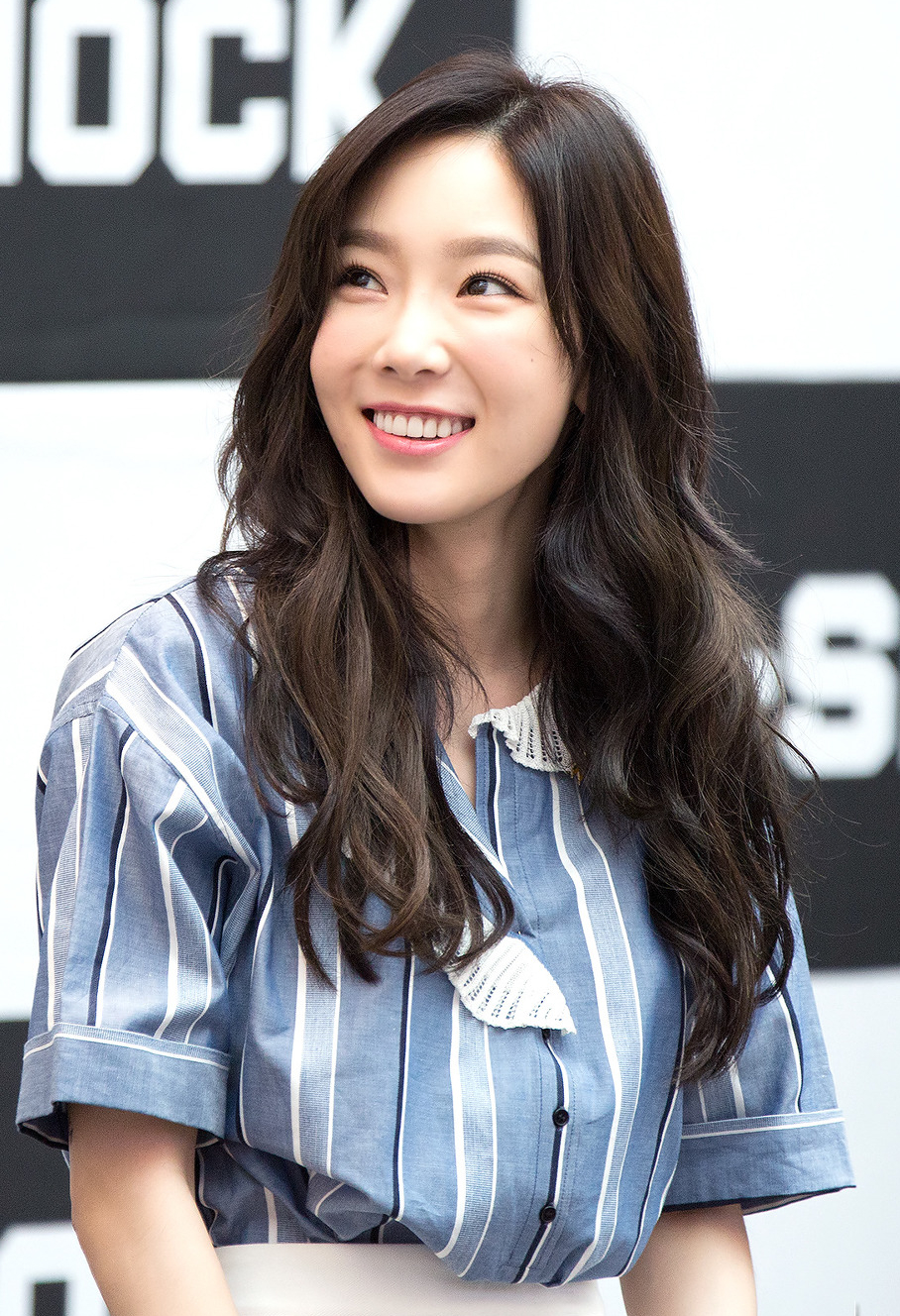
Taeyeon at a fansigning event in April 2017

Taeyeon's first studio album, My Voice, having been in the production process for over a year, was released in February 2017 and included the single "Fine". Both the album and song were well-received, topping both the Gaon Album Chart and Gaon Digital Chart, respectively. On April 5, 2017, a deluxe edition of the album was released, accompanied by the single "Make Me Love You". The song reached number four on the Gaon Digital Chart. Taeyeon also featured in the single "Lonely" from labelmate Jonghyun's second compilation album, which was released April 24, 2017. The following month, Taeyeon embarked on her first Asian tour, Persona.

In December 2017, Taeyeon released her special EP This Christmas: Winter Is Coming. The album debuted at number two on the Gaon Album Chart and at number six on the Billboard World Albums Chart. Hong Dam-young of The Korea Herald highlighted Taeyeon's "calm and undeniable vocal prowess" in the album while praising the songs as "the most sophisticated Christmas tunes" of the year. Its lead single, "This Christmas," debuted at number two on the Gaon Digital Chart. To promote the album, Taeyeon held a two-day Christmas concert titled The Magic of Christmas Time.

In June 2018, Taeyeon released her third EP, Something New. It peaked at number three on the Gaon Album Chart and at number four on the Billboard World Albums Chart. That same month, Taeyeon embarked on a Japan Showcase Tour, available only to members of SM Entertainment's official Japanese fan club. The tour visited Fukuoka, Nagoya, Tokyo and Osaka. Following the success of her sold-out showcase, Taeyeon released her debut Japanese single, "Stay", on June 30, 2018. The single was accompanied by a B-side titled "I'm The Greatest".

In August 2018, Taeyeon and MeloMance released a collaboration track titled "Page 0" for the third season of SM Station, marking Taeyeon's second time participating in the project. That same month, Taeyeon was announced to be part of Girls' Generation's second subgroup, Oh!GG, which consisted of the five members that re-signed with SM Entertainment; the group released their first single, "Lil' Touch" in September. Taeyeon embarked on her second Asian tour from October 2018 to January 2019. On October 12, it was announced that the tour would play a show at Hong Kong's AsiaWorld Expo Arena, making her the first South Korean female solo artist to hold a solo concert at the venue. Encore concerts of her tour were announced in early 2019 and took place at Seoul's Jamsil Arena on March 23 and 24.

Taeyeon released the digital single "Four Seasons" and its B-side "Blue" in March 2019. "Four Seasons" charted at number six on the Billboard World Digital Songs and topped South Korea's Gaon Digital Chart for two consecutive weeks. The song was certified double-platinum by the Korean Music Content Association for exceeding 200 million streams. In April 2019, Taeyeon embarked on her first concert tour in Japan, ~Signal~, which started on April 13 in Fukuoka. She subsequently released her first Japanese-language EP, Voice, on May 13. Taeyeon then contributed her vocals to Chancellor's "Angel" and Yoon Jong-shin's "A Train to Chuncheon", as part of his "Hello 30" project. The song was originally recorded by Kim Hyun-chul in 1989. In July 2019, Taeyeon appeared as a main cast member on the JTBC reality show Begin Again and busked in Berlin and Amsterdam. She also recorded "All About You" for the TVN television drama Hotel Del Luna; the song topped the Gaon Digital Chart for two consecutive weeks.

Taeyeon released her second studio album, Purpose, on October 28, 2019. The album peaked at number two in South Korea and spawned the single "Spark", which reached number two on the Gaon Digital Chart. The album was reissued on January 15, 2020, with three bonus tracks, including the single "Dear Me". To promote her recent releases, Taeyeon embarked on her third Asian tour, which began in Seoul on January 17, 2020. The shows—as well as her second concert tour in Japan, which was set to visit eight cities—were all eventually cancelled due to the COVID-19 pandemic.

=== 2020–present: Collaborations and continued success ===
On March 9, 2020, Taeyeon was set to release the digital single "Happy" in celebration of her birthday; however, she postponed the single's release to May 4 following the death of her father. The song reached number four on the Gaon Digital Chart and number nine on Billboard's World Digital Songs Chart. In November 2020, Taeyeon released her second Japanese-language EP #GirlsSpkOut. The title track of the same name featured Japanese rapper Chanmina, marking Taeyeon's first Japanese collaboration. In the same period, Taeyeon became a regular cast member on tvN's music variety show Amazing Saturday - DoReMi Market. Taeyeon released her fourth Korean-language EP What Do I Call You on December 15, 2020. The album peaked at number four on the Gaon Album Chart and sold over 120,000 units in South Korea, making Taeyeon the first female artist to have five different albums sell over 100,000 units each on the Gaon Album Chart.

Taeyeon was featured in Taemin's song "If I Could Tell You", released as part of his EP Advice (2021). Her next digital single, "Weekend" was released on July 6, 2021. The single peaked at number four on both the Gaon Digital Chart and the Billboard K-pop Hot 100 Chart. The following month, she joined the travel variety show Petkage alongside label-mate Kim Hee-chul. On August 30, 2021, Taeyeon was featured in Key's pre-release single "Hate That...". On November 28, 2021, Taeyeon recorded "Little Garden" for tvN's television drama Jirisan. On December 27, 2021, Taeyeon was revealed as a member of the supergroup Got the Beat alongside groupmate Hyoyeon. The group debuted on January 3, 2022.

On January 17, 2022, Taeyeon released her new digital single "Can't Control Myself", which serves as a pre-release single for her third studio album, INVU, which was released on February 14. The album peaked at number two on South Korea's Gaon Album Chart. "INVU" charted at number eight on the Billboard World Digital Songs and topped South Korea's Gaon Digital Chart for four consecutive weeks. She was awarded Best Female Solo Artist at the 2022 Genie Music Awards.

On May 5, 2023, it was announced that Taeyeon would hold her fifth concert, The Odd of Love, starting from June 3.

On November 27, 2023, Taeyeon released her fifth extended play, To. X, alongside the lead single of the same name. The EP and lead single reached number two on both the Circle Album Chart and Circle Digital Chart, respectively. "To. X" also peaked at number three on the Billboard South Korea Songs and became the best-performing single of January 2024 on the Circle Digital Chart. She also recorded "Dream" for JTBC's television series Welcome to Samdal-ri, which was a remake of Cho Yong-pil's 1991 song of the same name. The song gained traction on the video-sharing service Instagram Reels and reached number 18 on the Circle Digital Chart.

On June 24, 2024, it was announced that Taeyeon would be releasing the single "Heaven" on July 8. On August 29, Taeyeon collaborated with British musician Sam Smith to release a Korean duet version of "I'm Not the Only One", as part of the reissue project of their debut studio album, In the Lonely Hour 10 Year Anniversary Edition. On October 27, it was announced that Taeyeon would be releasing her sixth extended play Letter to Myself on November 18, containing six tracks including the lead single of the same name.

On January 7, 2025, it was announced that Taeyeon would hold her sixth concert tour to celebrate the 10th anniversary of her solo debut, The Tense, kicking off in Seoul on March 7. On December 1, the compilation album Panorama: The Best of Taeyeon, led by the single "Panorama", was released to mark the tenth anniversary of Taeyeon's solo career.

On November 9, 2026, it was announced that Taeyeon would release her fourth studio album Unspecial on November 30, containing 12 tracks including the lead single of the same name.

== Artistry and voice ==
Taeyeon's musical style has evolved over the course over her career, especially since debuting as a solo artist. In her early years, she predominantly recorded ballads for television soundtracks. With the popularity of songs such as "If" (2008) and "Can You Hear Me" (2009), she was referred to as the "representative singer of popular OSTs". Taeyeon opted for a pop rock sound in her 2015 debut single "I"; her 2016 single "Rain" incorporates elements of jazz and R&B; and "Why" blends EDM, R&B and tropical house. Vibe's Yoon Min-soo described Taeyeon's musical style as an example of "K-Soul": "I can feel that sort of emotions from the ballads Taeyeon sings. If you can feel a deep soul from a singer, that's 'K-Soul'."

Taeyeon has earned praise for her vocal talent, which has received attention from several major South Korean producers. In 2009, on MBC's Yoo Jae-suk & Kim Won-hee's Come to Play, Park Jin-young of JYP Entertainment expressed his wish to work with Taeyeon because of her "ability to tell a story through singing." Korean composer Yoo Young-seok noted Taeyeon's ability to sing as expressively as "a woman who has been divorced seven times." Music producer Jo Young-soo, who wrote her song "Like a Star", was likewise impressed by Taeyeon's ability to convey a variety emotions through her vocal performance. Taeyeon was selected as the best K-pop vocalist by 40 anonymous music industry officials in October 2015, and was named the best female vocalist in their twenties by twelve Korean music companies in April 2016.

Taeyeon has received praise for her vocal register and singing technique. Shin Yeon-ah, leader of girl group Big Mama and a vocal instructor at Howon University's Department of Applied Music, called Taeyeon a vocalization master and appreciated her breath control and capability to maintain impeccable vocal conditions even while dancing, attributed to her "well-developed core muscle strength". Seo Geun-young, a faculty member in the Postmodern Music Department at Kyung Hee University, highlighted Taeyeon as a vocalist who excels in maintaining the intricate balance between the thyroarytenoid and cricothyroid muscles while showcasing clarity in both low and high vocal ranges. Oh Han-seung, head of the Vocal Department at Dong-ah Institute of Media and Arts, highlighted Taeyeon's distinctive presence, emphasizing her ability to make the songs stand out without relying on elaborate arrangements or strong beats. Oh described Taeyeon's sound as "trendy, elegant, and sometimes poignant, covering a frequency range suitable for prolonged listening". Consequently, Oh praised Taeyeon's vocal quality as an ideal example of "natural compression", devoid of fatiguing frequencies that tire the ears.

== Public image and impact ==
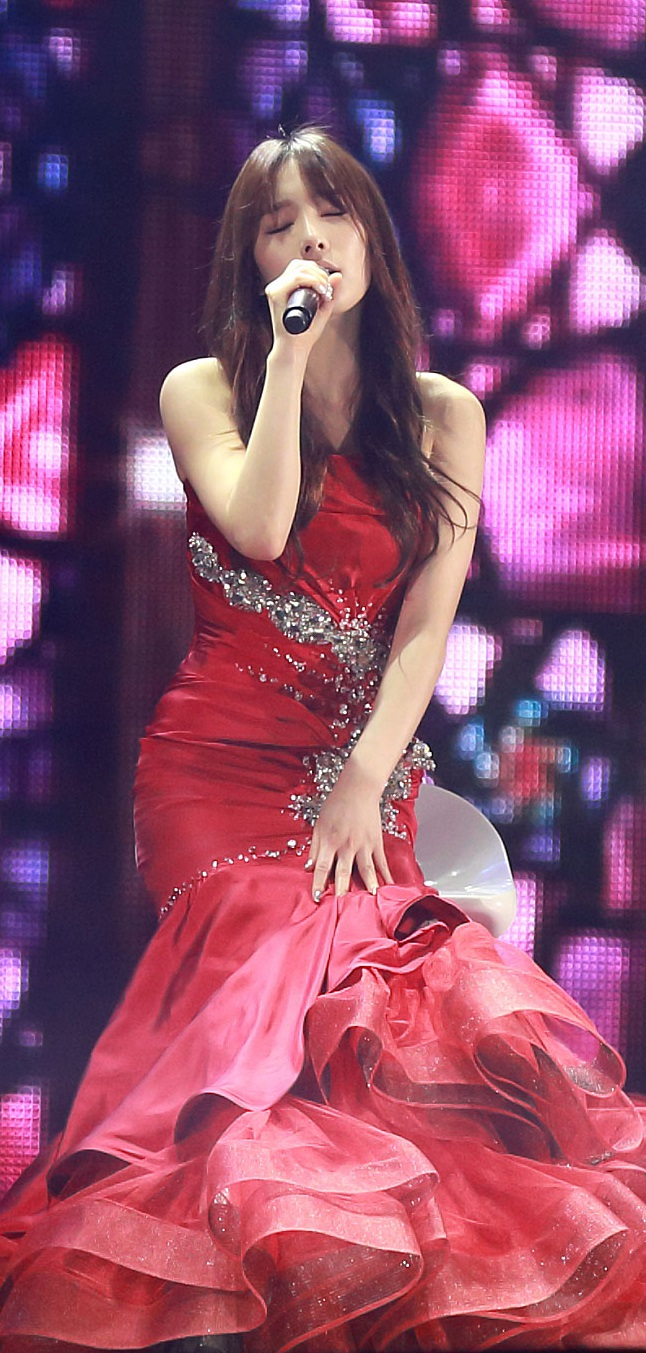
Taeyeon performing at the SMWeek concert in December 2013

Taeyeon has gained recognition in South Korea as both the leader of K-pop girl group Girls' Generation and a successful solo artist. Janelle Okwodu of Vogue described Taeyeon as "the Beyoncé" of Girls' Generation whose fashion styles are "constantly on the go." Taeyeon topped Gallup Korea's list of the most popular K-pop idols of 2016; she also appeared in the rankings in 2015 (at number three), 2017 (at number nine), and 2019 (at number seven). Taeyeon has been featured on the Forbes Korea Power Celebrity list in 2016 (at number 32), 2018 (at number 16), and 2019 (at number 23). In celebration of Women's History Month of 2024, The Recording Academy named Taeyeon on the list as one of 15 inspiring K-pop soloists. In June 2015, she became the first K-pop female celebrity to reach seven million followers on Instagram and, as of November 2023, has over 19 million followers.

Taeyeon sold over one million physical albums between 2011 and 2021, the highest-selling South Korean female artist at the time. She has influenced numerous K-pop artists, including Lovelyz's Jiae, Melody Day's Chahee, Cosmic Girls' Luda, CLC's Elkie, Sonamoo's High.D, Baek A-yeon, Mamamoo's Moonbyul, and Heize. Boy band BTS named Taeyeon an inspiration for their 2014 single "Boy In Luv".

== Philanthropy ==
In July 2019, Taeyeon donated ₩100 million to the Korean Red Cross, to help for support women, children and teenagers from low-income families in her hometown in North Jeolla. She also became the 132nd member of the "Red Cross Honors Club". The Red Cross Society of North Jeolla Province planned to expand its support for health supplies for women, girls and adolescents by recommending three primary, middle, and high schools in the region as beneficiaries of Taeyeon's donation.

In January 2023, Taeyeon donated ₩100 million to the Stump Foundation for Youth, to be allocated for the support of vulnerable adolescents who are under out-of-home care and adolescents whose protection ends after turning 18 and who are now prepared to take on the responsibility of self-sufficiency. Through this donation, she became the second member of "The Forest Club" following former Hana Financial Group's Chairman Kim Jeong-tae, which is a group of major donors created by the Stump Foundation for Youth. In July 2023, The Stump Foundation for Youth revealed its 1st "Dream Site Project" had been completed with Taeyeon's donation. The project was to improve child and youth welfare facilities. With her donation, interior & exterior facilities were improved such as installing shower booths and replacing tiles for women's bathroom, replacing stairs and railings for dormitory, replacing library decks, and installing air conditioners.

In March 2025, Taeyeon donated ₩100 million to the Korean Red Cross to help victims recover from the March 2025 South Korea wildfires.

== Endorsements ==
In Asia, Taeyeon has been regarded by some media outlets as a beauty icon and leader in fashion. She has endorsed various Korean beauty brands since her debut, appearing in commercials and advertisements both as a solo artist and with the members of Girls' Generation and Girls' Generation-TTS. Taeyeon's first solo endorsement was of A-Solution, a brand of acne cosmetics, in 2008. Two years later, she became the first female Asian brand ambassador of Korean skincare brand Nature Republic, along with boy group and labelmate Exo, for three consecutive years. In 2016, when Taeyeon's contract with Nature Republic expired, the cosmetic brand Banila Co. selected her to be its new spokesmodel due to her domestic and international popularity. In March 2019, Taeyeon represented the Chanel's Rouge Coco Flash Lipstick collection through beauty pictorial in the April issue of Elle Korea. In September 2019, French luxury makeup brand Givenchy Beauty released a lipstick makeup pictorial with Taeyeon in magazine High Cut Vol. 247. In May 2020, Taeyeon become a muse for A'pieu, a Korean beauty subsidiary brand of Missha; its official brand representative stated that "Taeyeon's pure atmosphere matches well to A'pieu's cosmetics." In August 2021, she was selected as ambassador for South Korean super-premium skincare beauty brand Sulwhasoo's "New Concentrated Ginseng Renewing EX" campaign. Amorepacific Corporation said that thanks to choosing Taeyeon to be the ambassador for this campaign, the "New Concentrated Ginseng Renewing EX" product line in the Chinese market contributed to a 50% growth in total Sulwhasoo sales and this product line has also grown strongly in the ASEAN region market. Following the announcement, she promoted the Sulwhasoo's campaign in various magazines, including Elle Korea, Harper's Bazaar Korea, and Cosmopolitan Korea. In April 2022, Taeyeon was selected as a muse of global makeup brand Benefit Cosmetics. In March 2023, Benefit Cosmetics had promoted her to its brand ambassador. In the Singles Korea October 2023 issue, for which she was the cover girl, Taeyeon represented the Benefit Cosmetics' 24 Tint collection. In March 2024, Benefit Cosmetics released a beauty pictorial with Taeyeon to commemorate the cumulative sales of 45 million units of "Benefit Cosmetics' Dandelion Blush". In the W Korea February 2024 issue, Taeyeon cooperated with British high-end fragrance brand Penhaligon's to present its two perfume lines, "Penhaligon's Artemisia Eau de Parfum" and "Penhaligon's Luna Eau de Toilette".

Taeyeon appeared in Elle Taiwan's April 2023 issue to represent the Louis Vuitton Spring/Summer 2023 ready-to-wear collection

Aside from her activities in the beauty industry, Taeyeon also endorsed Waterside Stone 3 game of Gamevil in 2007, bottled mineral water brand Jeju Samdasoo in 2016, Sword and Magic game of Kakao Games in 2016, bakery café franchise brand Paris Baguette in 2017, nail-art product brand Gelato Factory in 2018 and 2019, Déesse Color Contact Lenses in 2018, and Hyundai's Haesang Direct Car Insurance in 2019. From 2013 to 2014, she was also the first and only foreign spokesperson of B-ing Collagen Drink by Singha, a large Thai beverage corporation. She featured in commercial films for the product, broadcasting in various mass media channels, including numerous Thai local television and radio stations. Taeyeon also attended the B-ing Taeyeon's FinMeeting in Bangkok, a fan meeting sponsored by Singha. In October 2020, she was selected as a model for Gran Saga game of Npixel, due to its widespread popularity, Taeyeon then had promotional activities for the game in many other markets such as Taiwan, Hong Kong, Macau, Malaysia and Singapore in December 2022. In April 2021, she was selected as an exclusive model for ChongKunDang Healthcare's allatME Collagen. In May 2021, Taeyeon and her pet dog Zero were selected as brand models for pet lifestyle brand LieVe. In July 2021, she became the brand model for YoungMan Pizza, with the company official stating that Taeyeon "fits perfectly" with their "healthy and bright" brand image" and cited her "positive and good influence on society" as another reason for her selection. In July 2023, Jung Kwan-young, CEO of the YoungMan Pizza franchise, announced that the brand had renewed a contract with Taeyeon as a brand model. She became a model for Olive Young Omni Channel Campaign with labelmate Key in July 2021. In September 2021, Taeyeon was announced as the new muse of the contemporary streetwear brand model for Nerdy. In March 2022, Taeyeon was announced as the global ambassador of self-hairstyling brand eZn. In May 2022, she was selected as a model for Moonlight Blade M game of Aurora Studios, the studios were responsible for development of original PC client games of Tencent. In May 2022, she was named house ambassador for French luxury fashion house Louis Vuitton. She has been featured promoting the brand in various magazines, including Vogue Korea, Harper's Bazaar Korea, Elle Taiwan, Elle Hong Kong, and W Korea. In October 2024, she became the ambassador for the fine jewellery line "Le Damier de Louis Vuitton". for In March 2023, Taeyeon was selected as global ambassador for Tsingtao's non-alcoholic beverage. In June 2023, Taeyeon become the face for Narangd Cider, a zero-calorie soda product of Dong-A Otsuka; its official brand representative stated that "Taeyeon's unique healthy and fresh image matches well to Narangd Cider." In May 2024, Dongkook Pharmaceutical announced that Taeyeon was selected as a model for Madecassol, a brand of plant-based wound care products; its marketing representative commented that "We found her to be well-suited for the role of the "wound fairy", helping to care for children's injuries". In May 2025, Taeyeon became the face of Uber Taxi Korea's "Go Out And Play (GOAP)" campaign along with her bandmates Choi Soo-young and Tiffany Young.

== Discography ==
- My Voice (2017)
- Purpose (2019)
- INVU (2022)
- Unspecial (2026)

== Filmography ==
=== Films ===
| Year | Title | Role | Notes | Ref. |
|---|---|---|---|---|
| 2010 | Despicable Me | Margo | Korean dub | |
| 2012 | I Am | Herself | Biographical film of SM Town | |
| 2013 | Despicable Me 2 | Margo | Korean dub | |
| 2014 | My Brilliant Life | Herself | Cameo (with Tiffany and Seohyun) | |
| 2015 | SMTown The Stage | Herself | Documentary film of SM Town | |

=== Television series ===
| Year | Title | Role | Notes | Ref. |
|---|---|---|---|---|
| 2007 | Unstoppable Marriage | Bulgwang-dong's Seven Princesses Gang | Cameo (Episode 64) | |
| 2012 | Salamander Guru and The Shadows | Herself | Cameo (Episode 3–4) | |
| 2015 | The Producers | Herself | Cameo (Episode 1) | |

=== Television shows ===
| Year | Title | Role | Notes | Ref. |
|---|---|---|---|---|
| 2009 | We Got Married: Season 1 | Cast member | With Jung Hyung-don (Episode 42–54) | |
| 2010 | Win Win | Co-host | With Jang Wooyoung | |
| 2012–2013 | Show! Music Core | Co-host | With Tiffany and Seohyun | |
| 2015 | Daily Taengoo Cam | Cast member | Taeyeon's first reality show | |
| 2019 | Begin Again: Season 3 | Second team member | Episode 7–12 | |
| 2020–present | DoReMi Market | Cast member | Episode 135–present | |
| 2021 | Petkage | Co-host | With Kim Hee-chul, Kang Ki-young and Hong Hyun-hee | |
| 2022 | Queendom 2 | Host | With Lee Young-jin | |
| 2023 | Queendom Puzzle | Host | | |
| 2025–2026 | Sing Again | Judge | Season 4 | |

=== Web shows ===
| Year | Title | Role | Notes | Ref. |
|---|---|---|---|---|
| 2019–2020 | Petionista Taengoo | Cast member | | |
| 2021 | TaengKey Box | Co-host | With Key | |
| 2024 | Taeyeon's Frozen Journey | Host | | |
| 2024 | Zombieverse | Cast member | Season 2 | |

=== Hosting ===
| Year | Title | Notes | Ref. |
|---|---|---|---|
| 2012 | MBC Korean Music Wave in Bangkok | with Tiffany and Nichkhun | |
| 2012 | MBC Korean Music Wave in LA–SM Town Special! | with Tiffany and Leeteuk | |
| 2012 | MBC Korean Music Wave in Google | with Tiffany | |

=== Radio shows ===
| Year | Title | Role | Notes | Ref. |
|---|---|---|---|---|
| 2008–2009 | Kangin and Taeyeon's Chin Chin Radio | Co-host | With Kangin | |
| 2009–2010 | Taeyeon's Chin Chin Radio | Host | | |

== Theatre ==
| Year | Title | Role | Ref. |
|---|---|---|---|
| 2010 | Midnight Sun | Kaoru | |

== Concerts and tours ==
=== Headlining ===
==== Korea tours ====
- Butterfly Kiss (2016)
- The Magic of Christmas Time (2017)

==== Asia tours ====
- Persona (2017)
- 's... Taeyeon Concert (2018–2019)
- The Unseen (2020)
- The Odd of Love (2023)
- The Tense (2025)

==== Japan tours ====
- Japan Tour 2019 ~Signal~ (2019)

=== Concert participation ===
- SM Town Live Culture Humanity (2021)
- SM Town Live 2022: SMCU Express at Kwangya (2022)
- SM Town Live 2023: SMCU Palace at Kwangya (2023)

== Awards and nominations ==
Since debuting as a member of Girls' Generation, Taeyeon has received numerous nominations and awards for her solo activities in original soundtracks, radio show hosting and musical theatre. She won two Best Female Artist awards at the Mnet Asian Music Awards, as well as Bonsang awards at the 25th Seoul Music Awards and the 30th Golden Disc Awards. In January 2020, Taeyeon won the OST Award, Bonsang Award (Main Prize), and Daesang Award (Grand Prize) at the 29th Seoul Music Awards.
