= Happy (Taeyeon song) =

Single by Taeyeon
- Released: May 4, 2020
- Recorded: March 2020
- Genre: Doo-wop; R&B
- Length: 3:41
- Label: SM
- Composers: Chris Wahle; Chelcee Grimes; Samuel Gerongco; Robert Gerongco
- Lyricist: Lee Seu-ran

Taeyeon singles chronology
"Dear Me" (2020)	"Happy" (2020)	"#GirlsSpkOut" (2020)

Music video
- "Happy" on YouTube

"Happy" is a song recorded by South Korean singer Taeyeon, released as a digital single originally on March 9, 2020 but postponed to May 4, 2020, by SM Entertainment. It is a pop song that reinterprets old school doo-wop and R&B with a modern sound, being described as a special gift for fans with lyrics about emotion and happiness found in the time spent with loved ones. The song was later included in the CD & LP version of Taeyeon's fourth EP What Do I Call You as bonus track.

== Background ==
On March 3, 2020, a teaser photo with the title of the single was revealed on Taeyeon's official website. Hours later it was revealed that the release of the single would take place on March 9 in celebration of her birthday.

The music video for "Happy" was released on May 4, 2020. Taeyeon later filmed a live summer performance of the song, which was released on June 26.

== Release ==
On March 9, 2020, the day of the song's planned release, the singer intended to commemorate it with a broadcast on V Live; however, SM Entertainment released an official statement saying that the song's release would be postponed until further notice and the subsequent broadcast cancelled due to Taeyeon's father's death on the same day. On April 27, 2020, SM Entertainment announced that the song would be released on May 4. On April 29, 2020, it was announced that the singer would be broadcasting live on V Live on the day of the song's release, as previously planned.

== Commercial performance ==
Upon release, "Happy" topped all of South Korea's major realtime charts except Flo. It also topped iTunes Top Song Charts in 15 regions and rose to the top of the Korean music video chart of QQ Music.

It debuted at number 9 on the Billboard World Digital Songs chart with 1,000 downloads sold, becoming her 15th Top 10 entry on the chart. The song also debuted at number four on South Korea's Gaon Digital Chart for the chart issue dated May 3–9, 2020, becoming Taeyeon's 22nd top-ten entry in the country.

== Track listing ==
Digital download
No.	Title	Lyrics	Music	Arrangement	Length
1.	"Happy"	Lee Seu-ran	Chris Wahle; Chelcee Grimes; Samuel Gerongco; Robert Gerongco	Chris Wahle	3:41
Total length:					3:41

== Credits and personnel ==
Credits are adapted from Melon.

Studio

- SM Yellow Tail Studio – recording
- MonoTree Studio – recording, digital editing
- SM Big Shot Studio – digital editing, engineered for mix
- SM Blue Cup Studio – mixing
- 821 Sound – mastering

Personnel

- SM Entertainment – executive producer
- Lee Soo-man – producer
- Yoo Young-jin – music and sound supervisor
- Taeyeon – vocals
- Lee Seu-ran – lyrics
- Chris Wahle – composition, arrangement
- Chelcee Grimes – composition, background vocals
- Samuel Gerongco – composition
- Robert Gerongco – composition
- G-High – vocal directing, Pro Tools operating
- Choi Young-kyung – background vocals
- Gabriela Geneva (NIIVA) – background vocals
- Lee Tae-yoon – bass
- Noh Min-ji – recording
- Kang Sun-young – recording, digital editing
- Lee Min-kyu – digital editing, engineered for mix
- Jung Eui-seok – mixing
- Kwon Nam-woo – mastering

== Charts ==
=== Weekly charts ===
Chart performance for "Happy"
Chart (2020)	Peak position
South Korea (Gaon)	4
US World Digital Songs (Billboard)	9
South Korea (K-Pop Hot 100)	6

=== Monthly charts ===
Chart (2020)	Peak position
South Korean (Gaon)	9

=== Year-end charts ===
Chart (2020)	Position
South Korean (Gaon)	127

== Sales ==
Region	Sales
China (digital)	104,522
United States	1,000

== Awards and nominations ==
Year	Awards	Category	Result
2020	12th Melon Music Awards	Best R&B/Soul	Nominated
2021	10th Gaon Chart Music Awards	Song of the Year – May	Nominated

== Release history ==
Region	Date	Format	Label	Ref.
Various	May 4, 2020	digital download; streaming	SM Entertainment	
