= Starlight (Taeyeon song) =

2016 single by Taeyeon featuring Dean

Single by Taeyeon featuring Dean

from the EP Why
- Released: June 25, 2016
- Genre: Pop; R&B
- Length: 3:43
- Label: SM Entertainment
- Composers: Jamil "Digi" Chammas; Taylor Mckall; Tay Jasper; Adrian McKinnon; Leven Kali; Sara Forsberg; MZMC
- Lyricist: Lee Seu-ran

Taeyeon singles chronology
"Rain" (2016)	"Starlight" (2016)	"Why" (2016)

Dean singles chronology
"Shut Up & Groove" (2016)	"Starlight" (2016)	"And July" (2016)

Music video
- Official music video on YouTube

"Starlight" is a song by South Korean singers Taeyeon and Dean, taken from Taeyeon's second extended play (EP), Why (2016). The song was released on June 25, 2016, by SM Entertainment as the EP's lead single. The song's lyrics were penned by Jam Factory's Lee Seu-ran, while its music was composed by Jamil "Digi" Chammas, Taylor Mckall, Tay Jasper, Adrian McKinnon, Leven Kali, Sara Forsberg, and MZMC. "Starlight" is a pop and R&B song that features synthesizers in its instrumentation. Its lyrics detail a romantic relationship.

The single received generally positive reviews from music critics, who were favorable towards its musical styles and Dean's appearance. It peaked at number five on South Korea's Gaon Digital Chart and charted at number six on the US Billboard World Digital Songs. A music video for the song was directed by Im Seong-gwan and was released simultaneously with the release of the song. Filmed in Los Angeles, California, the visual depicts Taeyeon and Dean as a loving couple. Although Taeyeon never performed the song live on music shows, "Starlight" achieved the number-one spot on KBS2's Music Bank on July 8, 2016. The track was included on the setlist of Taeyeon's concert series Butterfly Kiss, taking place in Seoul and Busan in July and August 2016.

== Background and composition ==
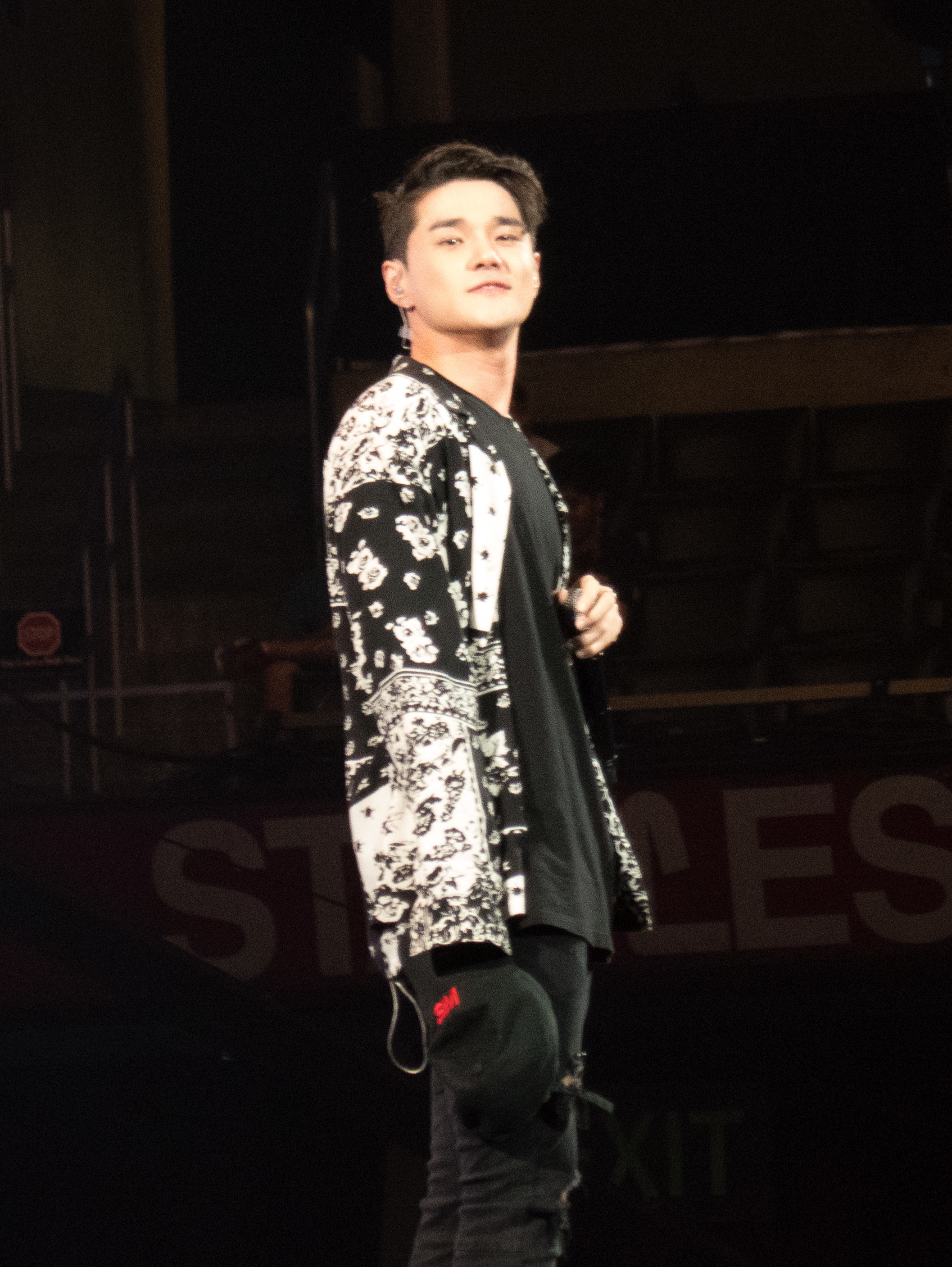
South Korean alternative R&B singer Dean was featured on "Starlight".

Taeyeon officially debuted as a solo singer in October 2015 with the extended play I, which was a commercial success, peaking at number two on South Korea's Gaon Album Chart and has sold over 140,000 copies in the country. Following the success of I, Taeyeon released a single for S.M. Entertainment's digital music platform SM Station titled "Rain", which was a number-one hit on South Korea's Gaon Digital Chart. As her popularity consolidated, S.M. Entertainment announced on June 17, 2016, that Taeyeon's second extended play Why would be released on June 28. It was also announced that "Starlight" featuring alternative R&B singer Dean would be released as the EP's lead single on June 25. "Starlight" is a midtempo 1990s retro pop and R&B song which features "bright" synthesizers in its instrumentation. Meanwhile, a writer from Special Broadcasting Service wrote that "Starlight" drew influences from R&B and EDM. The song's lyrics detail a romantic relationship with the lyrics "You are my starlight, shine on my heart / When I’m with you, it feels like I’m dreaming all day / You are my starlight, I get so happy / Your love is like a gift." (Note: Hangul: You are my starlight/ 내 맘을 비춰/ 함께 있으면 온종일 꿈꾸는 기분/ You are my starlight 참 행복해져/ 선물 같아 너란 사랑.")

== Reception ==
The single received generally positive reviews from music critics, who praised the song's musical styles. Jung So-young from OSEN (Online Sports and Entertainment News) described the song as having a "pleasant" feeling.

== Promotion ==
Taeyeon embarked on a series of concerts titled Butterfly Kiss. The concert took place in Seoul at Olympic Park on July 9–10, 2016, and in Busan at the KBS Hall on August 6–7, 2016. "Starlight" was included on the setlist of the show, which consisted of 22 songs in total.

In August 2019, she performed this song with NCT Jaehyun at 2019 SMTOWN Live in Tokyo

== Credits and personnel ==
Credits are adapted from the CD liner notes of Why.

- Recorded at S.M. Blue Ocean Studio
- Lyrics by Lee Seu-ran (이스란) (Jam Factory (music publisher))
- Composed by Jamil "Digi" Chammas, Taylor McKall, Tay Jasper, Adrian Mckinnon, Leven Kali, Sara Forsberg, MZMC
- Arranged by Jamil "Digi" Chammas, Taylor McKall, Tay Jasper, Leven Kali
- Administered by MARZ Music Group, LLC and MZMC Publishing

== Charts ==
Chart (2016)	Peak position
South Korea (Gaon)	5
US World Digital Songs (Billboard)	6

== Accolades ==
=== Music program awards ===
Program	Date	Ref.
Music Bank	July 8, 2016	

== See also ==
- List of Music Bank Chart winners (2016)
