= Little Garden =

Single by Taeyeon

from the album Jirisan OST
- Released: November 28, 2021
- Recorded: 2021
- Studio: doobdoob Studio; T Studio
- Length: 4:09
- Label: AStory; Most Contents; Dreamus
- Songwriter: Lee Joo-hyeong (MonoTree)
- Producers: Gaemi; Lee Joo-hyeong (MonoTree); jun-p (MonoTree)

Taeyeon singles chronology
"Hate That..." (2021)	"Little Garden" (2021)	"Can't Control Myself" (2022)

Music video
- "Little Garden" MV on YouTube "Little Garden" MV (Extended Drama Version) on YouTube

"Little Garden" (Korean: hangul=나의 작은 정원; RR: hangul=Naui jageun jeongwon; lit. 'My Little Garden') is a song recorded by South Korean singer Taeyeon for the soundtrack of the 2021 drama series Jirisan. It was released as a digital single on November 28, 2021, by AStory and Most Contents, under license by Dreamus.

== Background and release ==
On August 19, 2021, AStory confirmed that Taeyeon would be named in the first lineup to record the soundtrack for the drama series Jirisan. This marked the first time Taeyeon released a soundtrack recording after fifteen months, following "Kiss Me" for Do You Like Brahms? (2020). The song was released on November 28, 2021, its music video was released on November 30, 2021.

== Composition ==
"Little Garden" was described as a ballad led the intro with strings combined with melodic accompaniment of the piano create a dramatic atmosphere, excepting heavy echo and emotion were evoked with Taeyeon's warm and relaxed vocals, while its lyrics written like a fairytale. "Little Garden" was composed in the key of B major, with a tempo of 80 beats per minute.

The song, titled "나의 작은 정원" (literally "My Little Garden") in Korean and "Little Garden" in English, was written by Lee Joo-hyeong (MonoTree) and produced by Gaemi, who had previously produced the soundtracks for television series such as Descendants of the Sun, Moonlight Drawn by Clouds, When the Camellia Blooms and The World of the Married.

== Track listing ==
Digital download
No.	Title	Lyrics	Music	Arrangement	Length
1.	"Little Garden" (나의 작은 정원)	Lee Joo-hyeong (MonoTree)	Gaemi	Lee Joo-hyeong (MonoTree); Jun-p (MonoTree)	4:09
2.	"Little Garden" (Inst.)		Gaemi	Lee Joo-hyeong (MonoTree); Jun-p (MonoTree)	4:09
Total length:					8:18

== Credits ==
Credits adapted from Melon.

- Produced by Gaemi
- Lyrics by Lee Joo-hyeong (MonoTree)
- Music by Gaemi
- Arranged by Lee Joo-hyeong (MonoTree) and jun-p (MonoTree)
- Guitar performed by Jukjae
- Bass performed by Koo Bon-am
- Keyboard performed by jun-p
- Strings arranged and conducted by Nile Lee
- Strings performed by On the String
- Vocal directed by Lee Joo-hyeong
- Digital editing by Lee Joo-hyeong
- Recorded by Kwon Yu-jin at doobdoob Studio, Oh Seong-geun at T Studio
- Mixed by Koo Jong-pil at Klang Studio
- Mastered by Kwon Nam-woo at 821 Sound Mastering
- Promotion videos by Kang Su-yeon
- Cover designed by Baek Seo-young
- Executive producer: AStory (에이스토리), MOST CONTENTS (모스트콘텐츠)

== Charts ==
Chart performance for "Little Garden"
Chart (2021)	Peak position
South Korea (Circle)	113

== Accolades ==
Award and nominations for "Little Garden"
Award ceremony	Year	Category	Result	Ref.
Asian Pop Music Awards	2022	Best OST (Overseas)	Won	

== Release history ==
Region	Date	Format	Label	Ref.
Various	November 28, 2021	Digital download; streaming	AStory; Most Contents; Dreamus	
