= Weekend (Taeyeon song) =

Single by Taeyeon
- Language: Korean; English
- Released: July 6, 2021
- Genre: Synth-pop; city pop; disco
- Length: 3:53
- Label: SM; Dreamus
- Composers: RoseInPeace; Saimon; Willemijn van der Neut; Marcia "Misha" Sondeijker
- Lyricist: Hwang Yu-bin

Taeyeon singles chronology
"What Do I Call You" (2020)	"Weekend" (2021)	"Hate That..." (2021)

Music video
- "Weekend" on YouTube

"Weekend" is a song recorded by South Korean singer Taeyeon. It was released digitally on July 6, 2021, by SM Entertainment. The song is written by Hwang Yu-bin and composed by RoseInPeace, Saimon, Willemijn van der Neut, Marcia "Misha" Sondeijker. Initially a standalone single, the song was later included on Taeyeon's third studio album, INVU, released on February 14, 2022.

== Background and release ==
On June 29, 2021, it was announced that Taeyeon will be releasing a digital single titled "Weekend". On July 3, a portion of the music video was leaked on KBS's Mr. House Husband 2 before the release of the music video teaser. On July 4, the music video teaser was released. On July 6, the song together with the music video was released.

== Composition ==
"Weekend"
"Weekend" is a disco and city pop song with lyrics about "wanting to freely go on a trip during the weekend".

"Weekend" is composed by Hwang Yu-bin, RoseInPeace, Saimon, Willemijn van der Neut, and Marcia "Misha" Sondeijker. Musically, the song is described as a disco and city pop song characterized by guitar and retro synth sounds with lyrics about "wanting to freely go on a trip during the weekend". "Weekend" was composed in the key of A-flat major, with a tempo of 114 beats per minute.

== Commercial performance ==
Professional ratings
Review scores
Source	Rating
NME	5/5 stars

"Weekend" debuted at number ten on South Korea's Gaon Digital Chart in the chart issue dated July 4–10, 2021; on its component charts, the song debuted at number two on the Gaon Download Chart, and number 21 on the Gaon Streaming Chart. It ascended to number four on the Gaon Digital Chart in the following week, and number five on the Gaon Streaming Chart in the chart issue dated August 8–14, 2021. The song also spent 15 consecutive weeks in the Top 10 on the Gaon Digital Chart.

The song debuted at number seven and number 58 on Billboard World Digital Songs and K-pop Hot 100, respectively, in the chart issue dated July 17, 2021. The song ascended to number four on the Billboard K-pop Hot 100 in the chart issue dated September 18, 2021. The song debuted at number 16 on the Billboard South Korea Songs in the chart issue dated May 7, 2022. In Singapore, the song debuted at number seven on the RIAS Regional Chart in the chart issue dated July 9–15, 2021. Globally, the song debuted at number 181 on Billboard Global Excl. U.S. in the chart issue dated on July 24, 2021.

== Promotion ==
Prior to the song's release, on July 6, 2021, Taeyeon held a live event called "Weekend: Taeyeon Entertainment's 1st Half of the Year Meeting'" on V Live to introduce the song and communicate with her fans. Following the release of the single, she performed "Weekend" on four music programs: Mnet's M Countdown on July 8, KBS2's Music Bank on July 9, MBC's Show! Music Core on July 10, and SBS's Inkigayo on July 11.

== Accolades ==
"Weekend" was named one of the best K-pop songs of 2021 by Billboard (16th) and NME (13th). It received nominations for Artist of the Year – Digital Music (July) at the 11th Gaon Chart Music Awards, Digital Bonsang at the 36th Golden Disc Awards, and Best Dance Performance – Solo and Song of the Year at the 2021 Mnet Asian Music Awards.

== Credits and personnel ==
Credits adapted from liner notes of INVU.

Studio

- MonoTree Studio – recording
- SM Yellow Tail Studio – recording, digital editing
- SM LVYIN Studio – digital editing
- SM SSAM Studio – digital editing, engineered for mix
- SM Blue Cup Studio – mixing
- 821 Sound Mastering – mastering

Personnel

- SM Entertainment – executive producer
- Lee Soo-man – producer
- Yoo Young-jin – music and sound supervisor
- Taeyeon – vocals, background vocals
- Kwon Ae-jin – background vocals
- Willemijn van der Neut – background vocals, composition
- Hwang Yu-bin – lyrics
- RoseInPeace (Lee Sang-hyun) – composition, arrangement, drums, bass
- Saimon (Lee Seol-min) – composition, arrangement, guitar, keyboard
- Marcia "Misha" Sondeijker – composition
- G-high – vocal directing, Pro Tools operating
- Kang Sun-young – recording
- Noh Min-ji – recording, digital editing
- Lee Ji-hong – digital editing
- Kang Eun-ji – digital editing, engineered for mix
- Jung Eui-seok – mixing
- Kwon Nam-woo – mastering

== Charts ==
=== Weekly charts ===
Weekly chart performance for "Weekend"
Chart (2021–2022)	Peak position
Global Excl. U.S. (Billboard)	181
Singapore (RIAS)	7
South Korea (Gaon)	4
South Korea (K-pop Hot 100)	4
South Korea Songs (Billboard)	16
US World Digital Songs (Billboard)	6

=== Monthly charts ===
Monthly chart performance for "Weekend"
Chart (2021)	Peak position
South Korea (Gaon)	5
South Korea (K-pop Hot 100)	5

=== Year-end charts ===
2021 year-end chart performance for "Weekend"
Chart (2021)	Position
South Korea (Gaon)	26

2022 year-end chart performance for "Weekend"
Chart (2022)	Position
South Korea (Circle)	36

2023 year-end chart performance for "Weekend"
Chart (2023)	Position
South Korea (Circle)	186

== Certifications ==
Region	Certification	Certified units/sales
Streaming
South Korea (KMCA)	Platinum	100,000,000^{†}
^{†} Streaming-only figures based on certification alone.

== Release history ==
Release dates and formats for "Weekend"
Region	Date	Format	Label
Various	July 6, 2021	Digital download; streaming	SM; Dreamus

== See also ==
- List of certified songs in South Korea
