= Rain (Taeyeon song) =

Single by Taeyeon

from the album SM Station Season 1
- B-side: "Secret"
- Released: February 3, 2016
- Genre: Jazz; R&B
- Length: 3:42
- Label: SM Entertainment
- Composers: Matthew Tishler; Aaron Benward; Felicia Barton; Olivia Holt
- Lyricists: Bong Eun-young; Mafly; Lee Yoo-jin

Taeyeon singles chronology
"I" (2015)	"Rain" (2016)	"Starlight" (2016)

Music video
- "Rain" on YouTube

"Rain" is a song by South Korean singer Kim Tae-yeon, a member of the South Korean girl group Girls' Generation. It was released digitally by SM Entertainment on February 3, 2016.

== Background and composition ==
In January 2016, S.M. Entertainment announced that they were to launch a digital music platform called SM Station, in which SM artists would release a new song every week. "Rain" and its B-side track "Secret" served as the opening single of the project and were released on February 3, 2016. "Rain" is described as a midtempo song with jazz and R&B sounds. Lyrically, it uses rain as a metaphor to describe memories of past love.

== Music video ==
The music video for "Rain" was filmed indoors, having the concept of Taeyeon in a "room of memories", missing a past lover. It alternates between black and white scenes of Taeyeon singing alone in front of a microphone, and colored scenes of her in a flooding room. "Rain" was the most viewed music video by a South Korean act on YouTube in February 2016.

== Reception ==
"Rain" debuted atop South Korea's Gaon Digital Chart. It won the first place on SBS's music program Inkigayo on February 14, 2016. The song received a Digital Bonsang at the 31st Golden Disk Awards.

== Track listing ==
Credits are adapted from Naver.

No.	Title	Lyrics	Music	Arrangement	Length
1.	"Rain"	Bong Eun-young; Mafly; Lee Yoo-jin	Matthew Tishler; Aaron Benward; Felicia Barton; Olivia Holt	Matthew Tishler	3:42
2.	"Secret" (비밀)	Mafly	Im Kwang-wook (Devine Channel); Ryan Kim (Devine Channel); Aurora Pfeiffer; Tyler Shamy; Thaddeus Dixon; Kiana Brown	Thaddeus Dixon	3:37

== Credits and personnel ==
Credits are adapted from Naver.

Studio

- SM Yellow Tail Studio – recording
- MonoTree Studio – digital editing
- SM Concert Hall Studio – mixing
- Sterling Sound – mastering

Personnel

- SM Entertainment – executive producer
- Lee Soo-man – producer
- Taeyeon – vocals, background vocals
- Bong Eun-young – lyrics
- Mafly – lyrics
- Lee Yoo-jin – lyrics
- Matthew Tishler – composition, arrangement
- Aaron Benward – composition
- Felicia Barton – composition
- Olivia Holt – composition
- G-High – vocal directing, Pro Tools operating, digital editing
- Koo Jong-pil – recording
- Nam Koong-jin – mixing
- Tom Coyne – mastering

== Charts ==
=== Weekly charts ===
Chart	Peak position
South Korea (Gaon)	1
US World Digital Songs (Billboard)	3

=== Monthly chart ===
Chart (2016)	Position
South Korea (Gaon)	2

=== Year-end chart ===
Chart (2016)	Position
South Korea (Gaon)	24

== Sales ==
Region	Sales
South Korea (Gaon)	2,500,000

== Awards and nominations ==
Year	Award	Category	Result	Ref.
2016	8th Melon Music Awards	Best Ballad Song	Nominated	
2016	8th Melon Music Awards	Song of the Year	Nominated	
2016	18th Mnet Asian Music Awards	Best Vocal Performance Female Solo	Nominated	
2017	31st Golden Disc Awards	Digital Bonsang	Won	
2017	6th Gaon Chart Music Awards	Song of the Year – February	Nominated	

Music program awards
Program	Network	Date	Ref.
Inkigayo	SBS	February 14, 2016	

== Release history ==
Country	Date	Format	Label
Worldwide	February 3, 2016	Digital download	SM Entertainment
South Korea	February 4, 2016	Contemporary hit radio	SM Entertainment
