= Why (Taeyeon EP) =

- Digital cover artwork

EP by Taeyeon
- Released: June 28, 2016
- Genres: EDM; pop; R&B
- Length: 23:13
- Language: Korean
- Label: SM
- Producers: Lee Soo-man (exec.); LDN Noise

Taeyeon chronology
I (2015)	Why (2016)	My Voice (2017)

Singles from Why
- 1. "Starlight" Released: June 25, 2016; 2. "Why" Released: June 28, 2016

Why is the second extended play (EP) by South Korean singer Taeyeon, released by SM Entertainment on June 28, 2016. Lee Soo-man, founder of SM Entertainment, served as the producer of the album. The EP saw the contributions of alternative R&B singer Dean and Taeyeon's fellow Girls' Generation member Hyoyeon. Musically, Why incorporates various genres including EDM, R&B, and Pop.

To promote the EP, Taeyeon performed on three music programs, Music Bank, Show! Music Core, and Inkigayo from July 1–3, 2016. She further embarked on her first concert tour Butterfly Kiss, which visited Seoul and Busan in July and August 2016. Upon its release, Why received generally positive reviews from media outlets, who were favorable towards the EP's diverse musical styles and Taeyeon's vocals.

The EP was a commercial success in South Korea, peaking atop the Gaon Album Chart and has sold over 110,000 physical copies in the country. It also fared well in Taiwan, charting at number two on the G-Music chart and became the second best-selling release by a South Korean artist of 2016 in the country. The EP additionally charted at numbers thirty and two on the Japanese Oricon chart and the US Billboard World Albums, respectively. Two singles from Why, "Starlight" featuring Dean and "Why" also fared well commercially, entering the top ten of South Korea's Gaon Digital Chart.

== Background and release ==
On June 17, 2016, Taeyeon was announced to be releasing her second extended play titled Why. On June 20, it was reported that South Korean singer Dean was featured in the album. On June 22, Taeyeon's fellow Girls' Generation member Hyoyeon was revealed to be featured in the track "Up & Down".

== Promotion ==
Taeyeon began performing "Why" on South Korean music television programs on July 1, 2016. Her first concert tour titled "Butterfly Kiss" was held in Seoul and Busan in July and August 2016 respectively.

== Singles ==
The first single from Why, "Starlight", featuring South Korean singer Dean, and its music video were released on June 25, 2016, three days ahead of the album's release. The title track and second single, "Why", and its music video were released together with the album on June 28. A second music video for "Why", featuring the song's choreography, was released on July 7. "Starlight" and "Why" peaked at number 5 and 7 respectively on the South Korean Gaon weekly digital chart.

== Reception ==
Professional ratings
Review scores
Source	Rating
Idology	Positive
Korea JoongAng Daily	Positive
The Star	8/10
The Straits Times	3.5/5 stars

Why received generally positive reviews from media outlets. Lee Seo-jin from Korea JoongAng Daily praised Taeyeon's "addictive" vocal tone and wrote that the EP "proves [Taeyeon]'s potential as a solo artist". Chester Chin from The Star lauded the album's musical styles with "impressive melodies and a general feel-good vibe". He additionally complimented on Taeyeon's vocals and labelled Why as "a super solid" follow-up to her previous extended play I. Gwendolyn Ng writing for The Straits Times was mildly favorable, writing "Lead vocalist Kim slips into soloist mode with ease". However, Ng selected "Up & Down" as the EP's drawback and did not approve of Hyoyeon's contribution, saying "Hyoyeon's abrupt rapping comes in far too early and does not gel with the rest of the melody".

Why debuted at number one on the South Korean Gaon weekly album chart.

== Track listing ==
Why
No.	Title	Lyrics	Music	Arrangement	Length
1.	"Why"	Jo Yoon-kyung	LDN Noise; Lauren Dyson; Rodnae "Chikk" Bell	LDN Noise; Lauren Dyson; Rodnae "Chikk" Bell	3:27
2.	"Starlight" (featuring Dean)	Lee Seu-ran	Jamil "Digi" Chammas; Taylor Mckall; Jeremy "Tay" Jasper; Adrian McKinnon; Leven Kali; Sara Forsberg; MZMC	Jamil "Digi" Chammas; Taylor Mckall; Jeremy "Tay" Jasper; Leven Kali	3:43
3.	"Fashion"	Kim In-hyung	LDN Noise; Marissa Shipp; Brittany Mullen	LDN Noise; Marissa Shipp; Brittany Mullen	3:12
4.	"Hands on Me"	Yorkie (Devine Channel); Ryu Woo	Harvey Mason Jr. (The Underdogs); Damon Thomas (The Underdogs); Dewain Whitmore Jr.; Michael Jiminez	The Underdogs; Dewain Whitmore Jr.; Michael Jiminez	3:48
5.	"Up & Down" (featuring Hyoyeon)	Lee Seu-ran; Kim Min-ji	Ylva Dimberg (The Kennel); Herbie Crichlow; LDN Noise	Ylva Dimberg (The Kennel); Herbie Crichlow; LDN Noise	2:53
6.	"Good Thing"	Jung Joo-hee	LDN Noise; Alice Sophie Penrose; Carolyn Jordan	LDN Noise; Alice Sophie Penrose; Carolyn Jordan	2:57
7.	"Night"	Ryu Woo; Yorkie (Devine Channel)	Im Kwang-wook (Devine Channel); Ryan Kim (Devine Channel); Im "Chase" Chae-seop; Amanda Moseley (Devine Channel)	Devine Channel	3:13
Total length:					23:13

== Charts ==
=== Weekly charts ===
Chart (2016)	Peak position
French Digital Albums (SNEP)	120
Japanese Albums (Oricon)	30
South Korean Albums (Gaon)	1
Taiwanese East Asian Albums (G-Music)	2
US World Albums (Billboard)	2
US Heetseekers Albums (Billboard)	15
US Independent Albums (Billboard)	48

=== Year-end chart ===
Chart (2016)	Position
South Korean Albums (Gaon)	19
Taiwanese East Asian Albums (G-Music)	2

== Sales ==
Country	Sales amount
South Korea	112,754
Japan	6,234

== Release history ==
Region	Date	Format	Label	Ref.
South Korea	June 28, 2016	CD; digital download	SM Entertainment	
Worldwide	June 28, 2016	Digital download	SM Entertainment	
Taiwan	July 22, 2016	CD	SM Entertainment; Universal Music Taiwan	

== See also ==
- List of Gaon Album Chart number ones of 2016
