= 39th Golden Disc Awards =

2025 South Korean music awards ceremony

- Title card
- Date: January 4–5, 2025 (Ceremony); January 6–7, 2025 (Broadcast)
- Location: Mizuho PayPay Dome, Fukuoka, Japan
- Country: South Korea
- Hosted by: Sung Si-kyung; Cha Eun-woo; Moon Ga-young

Highlights
- Most awards: Aespa; Enhypen; Ive (3)

Television/radio coverage
- Network: JTBC

The 39th Golden Disc Awards (Korean: 제39회 골든디스크어워즈) is an award ceremony held on January 4–5, 2025, at the Mizuho PayPay Dome in Fukuoka, Japan. It honored the best in South Korean music released between early-November 2023 and early-November 2024. The event was hosted by Sung Si-kyung, Cha Eun-woo, and Moon Ga-young.

In the aftermath of the crash of Jeju Air Flight 2216, the live broadcast of the ceremony was postponed. The in-person ceremony proceeded as scheduled and will be recorded for broadcast on January 6–7, 2025, while the red carpet photo event has been canceled entirely.

== Criteria ==
Category	Online voting	Panelist (Note: Panelist consisted of professionals such as industry officials, K-pop reporters, music program producers, pop culture critics, major distribution officials, and Golden Disc Awards evaluation committee.)	Sales
Digital Daesang (Song of the Year)	N/A	40%	60%
Disc Daesang (Album of the Year)	N/A	40%	60%
Digital Song Bonsang	N/A	40%	60%
Album Bonsang	N/A	40%	60%
Rookie Artist of the Year (Note: Applies to all digital singles, extended plays/single albums with 6 or less songs, and studio albums.)	N/A	40%	60%
Most Popular Artist	100%	N/A	
Special Awards	N/A	100%	N/A
Data Sources: Circle Chart (Digital chart, Album chart); FandomChart, Mubeat, and My1P1ck (Voting Data)

== Performers ==
The first line-up of performers were announced on December 3. The second line-up were announced on December 9.

=== Day 1 (January 4) ===
Performances for Day 1
Artist(s)	Song(s) Performed
Kiss of Life	"Intro" "Sticky" (Corpse Bride version)
Close Your Eyes	"Time After Time"
Illit	"Intro" "Cherish (My Love)" (Moonlight remix) "Magnetic"
TWS	"Last Festival" "If I'm S, Can You Be My N?" "Plot Twist"
NewJeans	"Intro" "Supernatural" (Attention mix) "How Sweet"
Bibi	"Bam Yang Gang" "Sugar Rush"
Crush	"Love You with All My Heart" "Rush Hour"
Le Sserafim	"Intro" "Pierrot" "Crazy" (EBM remix)
Aespa	"Intro" "Set the Tone" "Supernova"
(G)I-dle	"Intro" "Super Lady" "Fate
Day6	"Monster" "Happy" "Welcome to the Show"

=== Day 2 (January 5) ===
Performances for Day 2
Artist(s)	Song(s) Performed
NCT Wish	"Wish" "Steady"
Izna	"Intro" "Izna"
Nowadays	"OoWee"
Zerobaseone	"Intro" "Good So Bad" "Feel the Pop"
Yuqi	"Intro" "Freak" "Radio (Dum Dum)"
Ive	"Intro" "Heya" "All Night" (Rock version)
Enhypen	"Intro" "XO (Only If You Say Yes)" "No Doubt" "Moonstruck"
GFriend	"Intro" "Rough" "Time for the Moon Night" "Season of Memories"
Tomorrow X Together	"Intro" "Over the Moon" "I’ll See You There Tomorrow"
Seventeen	"Water" (Hip-hop unit only) "Rain" (Performance unit only) "Cheers to Youth" (Vocal unit only) "Love, Money, Fame" "Very Nice"

== Presenters ==
The line-up of presenters were announced on December 6.

=== Day 1 (January 4) ===
- Park Eun-bin – presented Digital Song of the Year (Daesang)

=== Day 2 (January 5) ===
- Dae-ho Lee – presented Global K-pop Artist
- Dae-ho Lee and Park Bo-gum – presented Album of the Year (Daesang)

== Winners and nominees ==
Winners and nominees are listed in alphabetical order. Winners are listed first and emphasized in bold.

=== Main awards ===
Nominations for Digital Song Bonsang, Album Bonsang, and Rookie of the Year were announced on December 2, 2024.

Digital Daesang (Song of the Year)	Album Daesang (Album of the Year)
**Aespa – "Supernova"**; (G)I-dle – "Fate"; Bibi – "Bam Yang Gang"; Day6 – "Welcome to the Show"; Illit – "Magnetic"; IU – "Love Wins All"; Ive – "Heya"; NewJeans – "How Sweet"; Taeyeon – "To. X"; TWS – "Plot Twist"	**Seventeen** – **Spill the Feels**; (G)I-dle – 2; Aespa – Armageddon; Ateez – The World EP.Fin: Will; Enhypen – Romance: Untold; Ive – Ive Switch; NCT Dream – Dream()scape; Stray Kids – Ate; Tomorrow X Together – The Star Chapter: Sanctuary; Zerobaseone – You Had Me at Hello
Digital Song Bonsang	Album Bonsang
**(G)I-dle – "Fate"**; **Aespa – "Supernova"**; **Bibi – "Bam Yang Gang"**; **Day6 – "Welcome to the Show"**; **Illit – "Magnetic"**; **IU – "Love Wins All"**; **Ive – "Heya"**; **NewJeans – "How Sweet"**; **Taeyeon – "To. X"**; **TWS – "Plot Twist"**; Babymonster – "Sheesh"; Kiss of Life – "Sticky"; Le Sserafim – "Easy"; Lee Mu-jin – "Episode"; Lee Young-ji – "Small Girl" (feat. D.O.); Lim Jae-hyun – "Rhapsody of Sadness"; QWER – "T.B.H"; Riize – "Love 119"; Viviz – "Maniac"; Zico – "Spot!" (feat. Jennie)	**(G)I-dle** – **2**; **Aespa** – **Armageddon**; **Ateez** – **The World EP.Fin: Will**; **Enhypen** – **Romance: Untold**; **Ive** – **Ive Switch**; **NCT Dream** – **Dream()scape**; **Seventeen** – **Spill the Feels**; **Stray Kids** – **Ate**; **Tomorrow X Together** – **The Star Chapter: Sanctuary**; **Zerobaseone** – **You Had Me at Hello**; Babymonster – Drip; Baekhyun – Hello, World; BoyNextDoor – 19.99; NCT 127 – Walk; NCT Wish – Steady; Nmixx – Fe3O4: Break; Plave – Asterum: 134-1; Riize – Riizing; Twice – With You-th; Yuqi – Yuq1
Rookie Artist of the Year
**BabyMonster**; **Illit**; **NCT Wish**; **TWS**; All(H)Ours; Ampers&One; Nexz; Nowadays; One Pact; Unis

=== Popularity awards ===
The categories for the popularity awards were announced on December 5, and voting began on the same day, running until December 30. Voting is being conducted through three apps: FandomChart, Mubeat, and My1P1ck.

Most Popular Artist – Female	Most Popular Artist – Male
**Le Sserafim**; (G)I-dle; Aespa; Babymonster; Bibi; Illit; IU; Ive; Kiss of Life; NewJeans; Nmixx; Lee Young-ji; QWER; Taeyeon; Twice; Unis; Yuqi; Viviz	**Plave**; All(H)Ours; Ampers&One; Ateez; Baekhyun; BoyNextDoor; Day6; Enhypen; Lee Mu-jin; Lim Jae-hyun; NCT 127; NCT Dream; NCT Wish; Nexz; Nowadays; One Pact; Riize; Seventeen; Stray Kids; Tomorrow X Together; TWS; Zerobaseone; Zico

=== Special awards ===
List of winners for the special awards
Best Band	Best Group
**Day6**	**Le Sserafim**
Best OST	Best Producer
**Crush – "Love You with All My Heart" (from Queen of Tears)**	**Han Sung-soo (Pledis Entertainment)**
Best Solo	Cosmopolitan Artist of the Year
**Yuqi**	**NewJeans**
Fans' Choice with Nongshim Shin Ramyun	Global K-pop Artist
**Enhypen**	**Enhypen**; **Ive**
Golden Honorable Choice	Next Generation
**Shin Hae-chul** (posthumous award)	**Kiss of Life**

== Multiple awards ==
The following artist(s) received two or more awards:

Count	Artist(s)
3	Aespa
3	Enhypen
3	Ive
2	(G)I-dle
2	Day6
2	Illit
2	Le Sserafim
2	NewJeans
2	Seventeen
2	TWS
