= 2024 MAMA Awards =

26th edition of the MAMA Awards held in 2024

- Date: November 21–23, 2024
- Venue: Dolby Theatre, Los Angeles; Kyocera Dome Osaka, Japan
- Presented by: Visa
- Hosted by: Park Bo-gum (Nov 21); Kim Tae-ri (Nov 23)

Highlights
- Most wins: Aespa (6)
- Website: 2024 MAMA Awards

Television/radio coverage
- Network: Mnet, TVING, and global broadcasting partners
- Runtime: 140 Minutes (Nov 21); 185 Minutes (Nov 23)

The 2024 MAMA Awards was held on November 21 at the Dolby Theatre in Los Angeles, California and on November 22 and 23 at the Kyocera Dome in Osaka, Japan. Actor and singer Park Bo-gum hosted the US part of the ceremony, while actress Kim Tae-ri hosted the second night of the ceremony in Japan.

== Background ==
The event was organized by CJ ENM through Mnet. This was the first time that the event was held in the United States and the first time it was held outside Asia. The ceremony's theme was "Big Blur: What is Real?", reflecting the blurred lines between music, culture, and individual preferences.

=== Selection process ===
All songs and albums that are eligible to be nominated must be released from October 1, 2023, to September 30, 2024. Round 1 voting for Fans' Choice Male & Female started on October 14, 7 PM KST until October 25, 11:59 PM KST. Round 2 voting together with Fans' Choice of the Year was conducted from November 1 to 15 and during the Live Broadcast segments of the award show before Chapter 1's Japan Ceremony segment.

Criteria for 2024 MAMA Awards nominations
| Category | Digital sales (Download + Streaming) | Record sales | Online voting | Judges panel evaluations |
|---|---|---|---|---|
| Artist of the Year | 40% (25% Korea + 15% Global) | 40% | N/A | 20% |
| Categories by Artist (Note: Consists of Best New Male & Female Artist, Best Male & Female Artist, and Best Male & Female Group) | 40% (25% Korea + 15% Global) | 40% | N/A | 20% |
| Song of the Year | 60% (40% Korea + 20% Global) | N/A | | 40% |
| Categories by Genre (Note: Consists of Best Dance Performance – Male & Female Solo & Group, Best Vocal Performance – Solo & Group, Best Rap & Hip Hop Music, Best Collaboration, and Best OST) | 60% (40% Korea + 20% Global) | N/A | | 40% |
| Album of the Year | N/A | 60% | N/A | 40% |
| Best Music Video & Best Choreography | N/A | | | 100% |
| Fans' Choice Categories | N/A | | 100% (90% Mnet Plus + 10% X/Twitter Votes) | N/A |
| Fans' Choice of the Year | N/A | | 100% (90% Mnet Plus + 10% X/Twitter Votes) | N/A |
Data Sources: Circle Chart (Domestic/Global Song Streaming/Downloads, Album Sales), X (SNS Voting Data)

== Performers ==
=== Chapter 1 ===
==== November 21 (USA) ====
Performances for Day 1
| Artist(s) | Song(s) Performed | Theme Name |
|---|---|---|
| TWS; Illit; Riize | "Dynamite" (TWS only) "Heart Shaker" (Illit only) "Kick It" (Riize only) | Opening Sequence |
| Young Posse | "Ate That" "Loading Freestyle" "XXL" | Would You Like To Posse? |
| Katseye; Los Angeles Rams Cheerleaders | "Debut" "Touch" | Touchdown |
| TWS | "Oh Mymy: 7s" "Plot Twist" | TWS Club |
| Illit | "Magnetic" "Cherish (My Love)" | ILLusion IT |
| Riize | "Get a Guitar" "Boom Boom Bass" | The Destined SunRIIZE |
| J. Y. Park | "Don't Leave Me" "She Was Pretty" "Honey" "Who's Your Mama?" "Easy Lover" (with Anderson .Paak) | System Update: JYP 3.0 |

==== November 22 (Japan) ====
Performances for Day 1
| Artist(s) | Song(s) Performed | Theme Name |
|---|---|---|
| Yeonjun | "Ggum" | What Is Real? |
| Me:I | "& Me" "Click" | Me + I = MIRAI |
| BoyNextDoor | "Nice Guy" (MAMA version) "Earth, Wind & Fire" | Nice Night Serenade |
| Toenze (Note: Toenze is a project band formed only for the 2024 MAMA Awards. The song is performed by Beomgyu and HueningKai of Tomorrow X Together, Jay of Enhypen, and Kim Tae-rae and Han Yu-jin of Zerobaseone.) | "Left-hander" (MAMA version) | Toenze |
| Izna | Intro: "Final Love Song" / "IWALY" / "Drip" / "Fake It" "Izna" "Timebomb" | Who Dat Girl? |
| Lee Young-ji | "CTL (Cross The Line)" (with Lee Ji-ah) "Small Girl" (with Plave) | Cross The Line |
| Plave | "Way 4 Luv" | Cross The Line |
| Ive | "Accendio" "Heya" | Guardians Of The Sun |
| Enhypen | "XO (Only If You Say Yes)" "Brought the Heat Back" "Daydream" | They Dream |
| Treasure | "Intro" "King Kong" "Run" | TREASURE.exe |
| Tomorrow X Together | "Deja Vu" "Over The Moon" | Savior |
| Rosé; Bruno Mars | "APT." | Random Game! |

=== Chapter 2 ===
==== November 23 (Japan) ====
Performances for Day 1
| Artist(s) | Song(s) Performed | Theme Name |
|---|---|---|
| INI | "Loud" (MAMA version) "WMDA (Where My Drums At)" (MAMA version) | Revolution: Change The View |
| Bibi; Ahn Jae-hyun | "Bam Yang Gang" (MAMA version) | BIBIdi Bobbidi BAM |
| Meovv | "Meow" "Body" | Shake Sum Body |
| Zerobaseone | "Kill The Romeo" "Good So Bad" | Kill The Romeo |
| (G)I-dle | "Freestyle Intro" (Soyeon solo) "Super Lady" "Fate" (MAMA version) | Breaking News: The Shout |
| Byeon Woo-seok | "Sudden Shower" (MAMA version) | Go Back |
| G-Dragon | "Untitled, 2014" "Power" "Home Sweet Home" (with Daesung and Taeyang) (Note: Credited as G-Dragon's solo stage set during the performance.) | Übermensch |
| BigBang | "Bang Bang Bang" "Fantastic Baby" | Übermensch |
| Aespa | Intro: "Bored!" (Ningning solo) / "Spark" (Winter solo) / "Dopamine" (Giselle solo) / "Up" (Karina solo) "Supernova" (MAMA version) "Whiplash" (MAMA version) | The Multiverse Awakes: Another I |
| Seventeen | "Maestro" "Ash" "Love, Money, Fame" | The Real Maestro: Right Here |

== Presenters ==
2024 MAMA Awards hosts

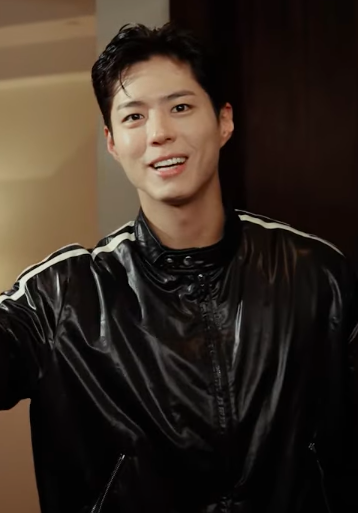
Park Bo-gum

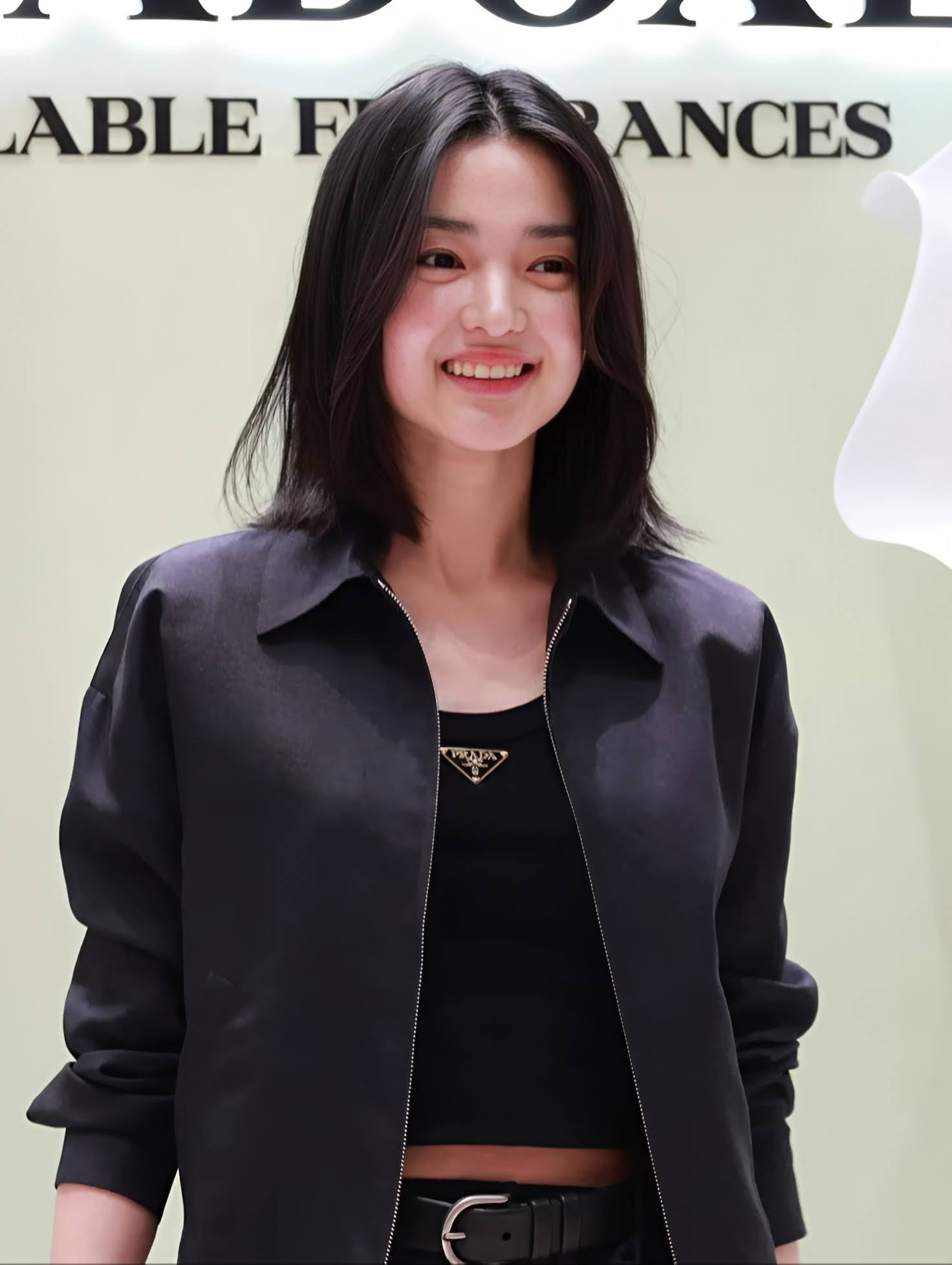
Kim Tae-ri

=== Chapter 1 ===
==== November 21 (USA) ====
- Eric Nam – Red Carpet Host
- Park Bo-gum – Main Ceremony Host
- Dustin Hoffman – presented Best New Male Artist
- Lance Bass – presented Favorite Global Performer – Male
- Lee Isaac Chung – presented MAMA Award for Best Dance Performance – Male Group
- Da'Vine Joy Randolph – presented Best New Female Artist
- Anderson .Paak – presented Inspiring Achievement

==== November 22 (Japan) ====
- Lee Hye-Sung and Hanhae – Red Carpet Host
- Karina, Sung Han-Bin, Yoshi, and Rei – Opening speech
- Gong Myung and Kim Min-ha – presented Fans' Choice Top 10 and Ponta Pass Global Favorite Artist
- Lee Young-ji and Na Yeong-seok – presented Fans' Choice Top 10 and Favorite Rising Artist
- Seol In-ah – presented Fans' Choice Top 10 and Olive Young K-Beauty Star in Music
- Lee Hye-sung and Hanhae – presented Fans' Choice Top 10 and Favorite Male Group
- Jo Yu-ri – Introduction to CJ Group & UNESCO girls' education in developing countries campaign
- Hong Jin-kyung – presented Fans' Choice Top 10 and Favorite New Asian Artist
- Kwak Dong-yeon and Jo Yu-ri – presented Fans' Choice Top 10 and Worldwine KCONER's Choice
- Lee Ji-ah – presented Global Sensation
- Choi Hyun-wook – presented Fans' Choice Top 10 and Favorite Dance Performance – Male Group
- Ahn Jae-hyun and Seo In-guk – presented Favorite Global Performer – Female and Fans' Choice Top 10
- Byeon Woo-seok – presented Visa Fans' Choice of the Year (Daesang) and closing speech

=== Chapter 2 ===
==== November 23 (Japan) ====
- Lee Hye-sung and Hanhae – Red Carpet Host
- Kim Tae-ri – Main Ceremony Host and introduced G-Dragon
- Moon Sang-min and Kim Hye-jun – presented Best Dance Performance – Female Group
- Oh Sang-uk – presented Visa Super Stage
- Na Yeong-seok and Dex – presented Best Choreography and Favorite Global Trending Music
- Yim Si-wan and Lee Joo-bin – presented Best Female Group and Favorite Asian Artist
- Ahn Jae-hyun and Seo In-guk – presented Best Music Video and Best Male Group
- Lee Hye-sung and Hanhae – presented Best Vocal Performance – Solo
- Im Si-wan and Mei Nagano – presented Best Vocal Performance – Group
- HoYeon Jung – presented Music Visionary of the Year
- Park Seo-joon – presented Visa Album of the Year (Daesang)
- Lee Jun-ho – presented Visa Song of the Year (Daesang)
- Ma Dong-seok – presented Visa Artist of the Year (Daesang)

== Winners and nominees ==
The list of nominees was announced via livestream on October 14, 2024, and voting for Fans' Choice started shortly after. Nominees are listed in alphanumerical order. Winners are listed first and highlighted in bold.

=== Main awards ===
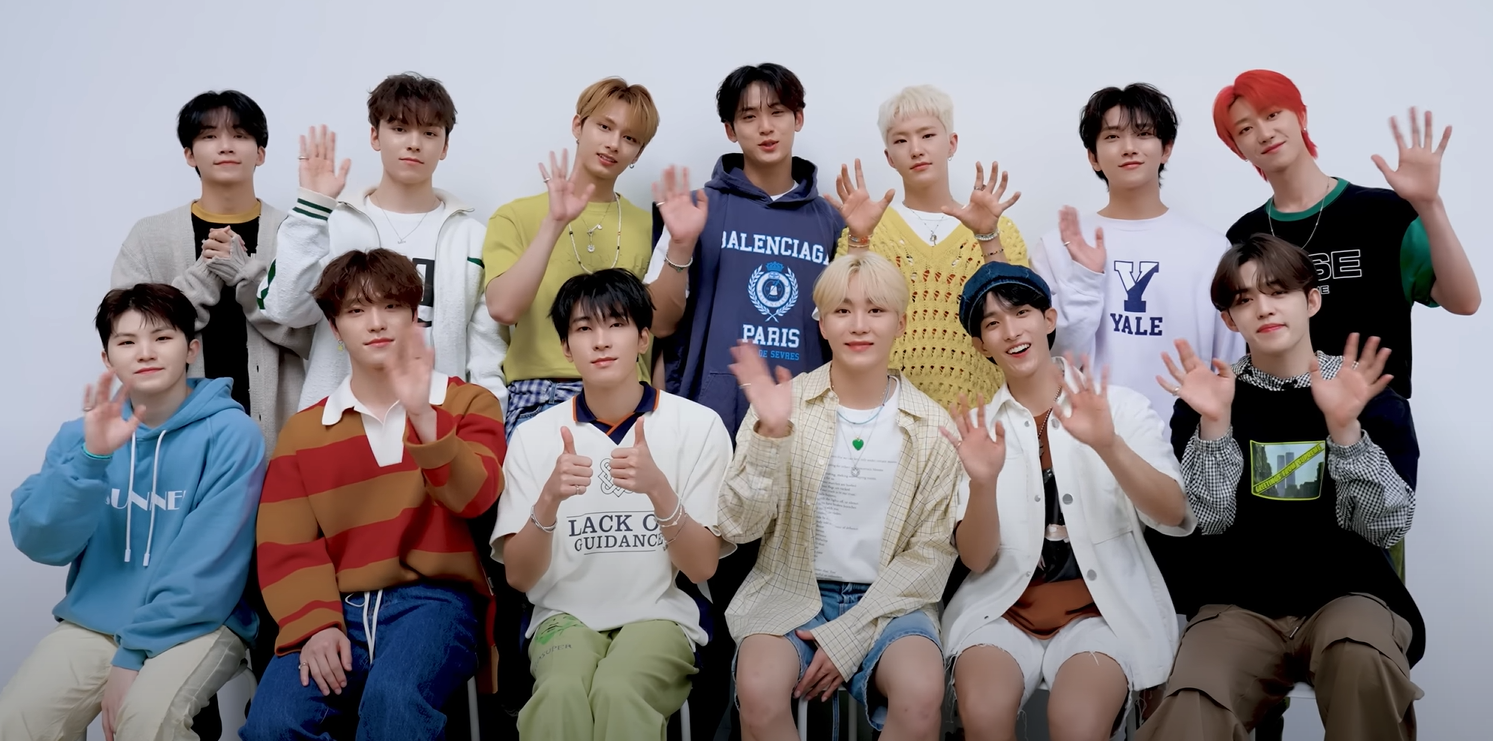
Seventeen won Artist of the Year (Daesang) and Album of the Year (Daesang)

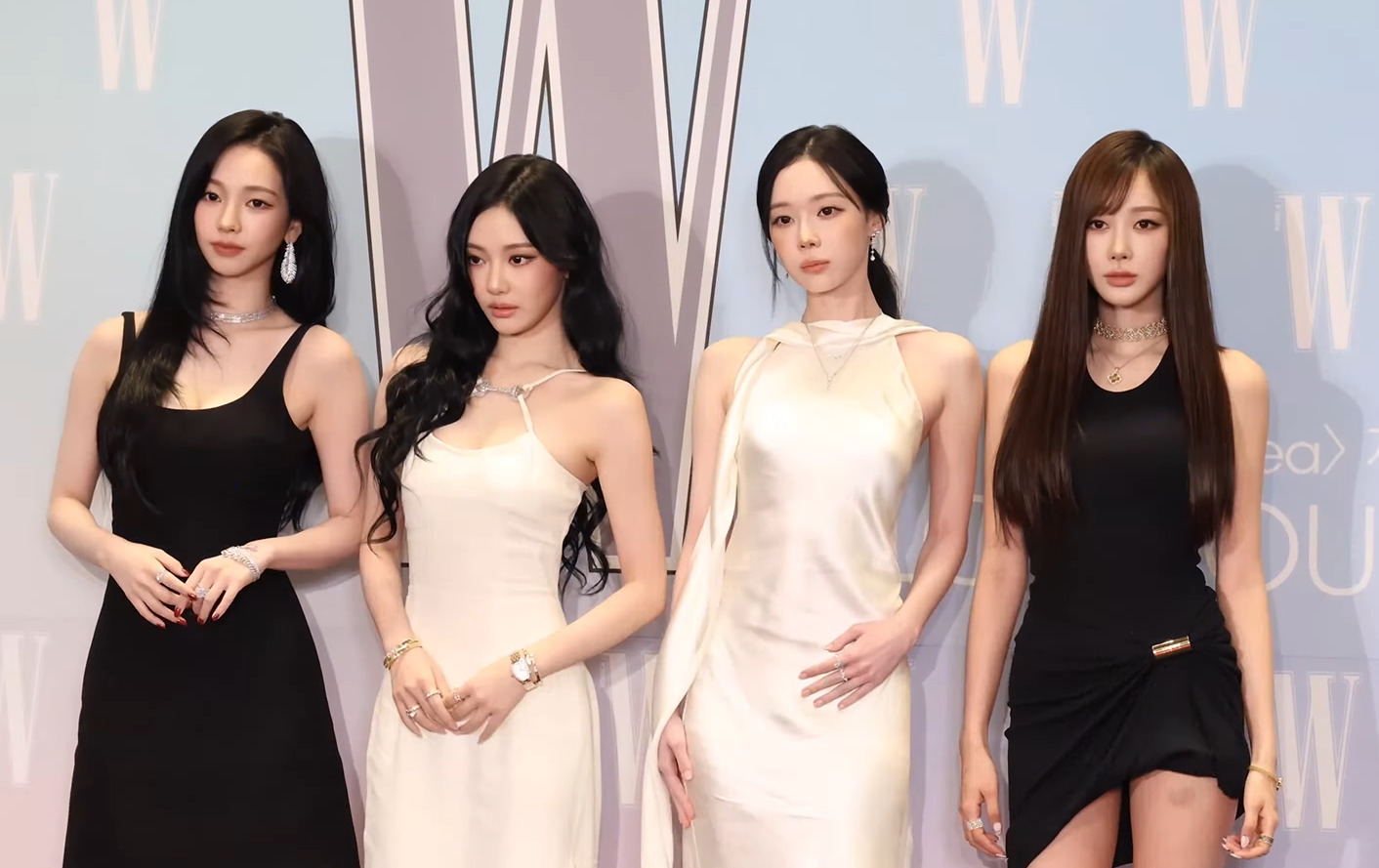
Aespa won Song of the Year (Daesang)

| Visa Artist of the Year (Daesang) | Visa Song of the Year (Daesang) |
|---|---|
| **Seventeen**; Aespa; Jung Kook; NewJeans; Stray Kids; List of longlisted nominees: (G)I-dle; 82Major; All(H)Ours; Ampers&One; Babymonster; Baekhyun; Day6; Enhypen; Illit; IU; Ive; Jennie; Jimin; Le Sserafim; Lim Young-woong; Nayeon; NCT Dream; NCT Wish; Nowadays; Meovv; QWER; Taemin; Taeyeon; Tomorrow X Together; Twice; TWS; Unis; Young Posse; Yuqi; Zerobaseone | **Aespa – "Supernova"**; Bibi – "Bam Yang Gang"; IU – "Love Wins All"; Illit – "Magnetic"; NewJeans – "How Sweet"; List of longlisted nominees: (G)I-dle – "Fate"; (G)I-dle – "Super Lady"; AKMU – "Hero"; Aespa – "Armageddon"; Crush – "Love You With All My Heart"; Davichi – "A Very Personal Story"; Day6 – "Welcome to the Show"; Dean – "Die 4 You"; Eclipse (Note: Eclipse is a fictional band from the series Lovely Runner. The song is performed by Byeon Woo-seok as vocalist, Lee Seung-hyub as guitarist, Yang Hyuk as bassist, and Moon Yong-suk as drummer.) – "Sudden Shower"; Enhypen – "Sweet Venom"; GroovyRoom – "Yes or No" (feat. Huh Yunjin & Crush); Hwasa – "Na"; Hyukoh & Sunset Rollercoaster – "Young Man"; Ive – "Baddie"; Ive – "Heya"; Jay Park – "Taxi Blurr" (feat. Natty); Jennie – "You & Me"; Jimin – "Who"; Jung Kook – "Standing Next to You"; K.Will – "No Sad Song for My Broken Heart"; Key – "Pleasure Shop"; Le Sserafim – "Crazy"; Le Sserafim – "Easy"; Lee Chang-sub – "Heavenly Fate"; Lee Mu-jin – "Episode"; Lee Young-ji – "Small Girl" (feat. D.O.); Leellamarz – "Boys Like Girls" (feat. Gist & Jayci Yucca); Lim Young-woong – "Warmth"; Lucy – "The Knight Who Can't Die and the Silk Cradle"; N.Flying – "Into You"; Nayeon – "ABCD"; NCT 127 – "Fact Check"; NewJeans – "Supernatural"; Plave – "Way 4 Luv"; QWER – "T.B.H"; Red Velvet – "Cosmic"; Riize – "Impossible"; Riize – "Love 119"; RM – "Lost! "; Roy Kim – "Whenever, Wherever"; Seventeen – "God of Music"; Seventeen – "Maestro"; Stray Kids – "Lalalala"; Sung Si-kyung & Naul – "Even for a moment"; Sunmi – "Balloon in Love"; Taemin – "Guilty"; Taeyeon – "Dream"; Taeyeon – "To. X"; Taeyong – "Tap"; TWS – "Plot Twist"; Yuqi – "Freak"; Zico – "Spot!" (feat. Jennie) |
| Visa Album of the Year (Daesang) | Visa Fans' Choice of the Year (Daesang) |
| **Seventeen – Seventeenth Heaven**; Enhypen – Romance: Untold; Jung Kook – Golden; Stray Kids – Rock-Star; Tomorrow X Together – The Name Chapter: Freefall; List of longlisted nominees: (G)I-dle – 2; Aespa – Armageddon; Ateez – The World EP.Fin: Will; Baekhyun – Hello, World; Enhypen – Romance: Untold; Ive – I've Mine; Jung Kook – Golden; Le Sserafim – Easy; NCT 127 – Fact Check; NCT Dream – Dream()scape; Seventeen – Seventeenth Heaven; Stray Kids – Rock-Star; Riize – Riizing; Tomorrow X Together – The Name Chapter: Freefall; Twice – With You-th; Zerobaseone – Melting Point | **Jimin**; (G)I-dle; Aespa; Babymonster; Enhypen; Ive; IU; Jennie; Jung Kook; Lee Young-ji; NCT Dream; NewJeans; RM; Seventeen; Stray Kids; Tomorrow X Together; Twice; Unis; V; Zerobaseone |
| Best Male Group | Best Female Group |
| **Seventeen**; Enhypen; NCT Dream; Stray Kids; Tomorrow X Together; Zerobaseone | **Aespa**; (G)I-dle; Ive; Le Sserafim; NewJeans; Twice |
| Best Male Artist | Best Female Artist |
| **Jung Kook**; Baekhyun; Lim Young-woong; Jimin; Taemin | **IU**; Jennie; Nayeon; Taeyeon; Yuqi |
| Best Dance Performance – Male Group | Best Dance Performance – Female Group |
| **TWS – "Plot Twist"**; Enhypen – "Sweet Venom"; NCT 127 – "Fact Check"; Riize – "Love 119"; Seventeen – "God of Music"; Stray Kids – "Lalalala" | **Aespa – "Supernova"**; (G)I-dle – "Super Lady"; Illit – "Magnetic"; Ive – "Baddie"; Le Sserafim – "Easy"; NewJeans – "How Sweet" |
| Best Vocal Performance – Solo | Best Vocal Performance – Group |
| **Bibi – "Bam Yang Gang"**; IU – "Love Wins All"; Lee Mu-jin – "Episode"; Lim Young-woong – "Warmth"; Taeyeon – "To. X" | **(G)I-dle – "Fate"**; AKMU – "Hero"; Davichi – "A Very Personal Story"; Plave – "Way 4 Luv"; Red Velvet – "Cosmic" |
| Best Dance Performance – Male Solo | Best Dance Performance – Female Solo |
| **Jung Kook – "Standing Next to You"**; Jimin – "Who"; Key – "Pleasure Shop"; Taemin – "Guilty"; Taeyong – "Tap" | **Jennie – "You & Me"**; Hwasa – "Na"; Nayeon – "ABCD"; Sunmi – "Balloon in Love"; Yuqi – "Freak" |
| Best New Male Artist | Best New Female Artist |
| **TWS**; 82Major; Ampers&One; All(H)Ours; NCT Wish; Nowadays | **Illit**; BabyMonster; Meovv; QWER; Unis; Young Posse |
| Best OST | Best Band Performance |
| **Crush – "Love You With All My Heart" (from Queen of Tears)**; Eclipse – "Sudden Shower" (from Lovely Runner); Lee Chang-sub – "Heavenly Fate" (from A Not So Fairytale); Roy Kim – "Whenever, Wherever" (from My Demon); Taeyeon – "Dream" (from Welcome to Samdal-ri) | **QWER – "T.B.H"**; Day6 – "Welcome to the Show"; Hyukoh & Sunset Rollercoaster – "Young Man"; Lucy – "The Knight Who Can't Die and the Silk Cradle"; N.Flying – "Into You" |
| Best Rap & Hip Hop Performance | Best Collaboration |
| **Zico – "Spot!" (feat. Jennie)**; Dean – "Die 4 You"; Lee Young-ji – "Small Girl" (feat. D.O.); Leellamarz – "Boys Like Girls" (feat. Gist & Jayci Yucca); RM – "Lost! " | **Zico – "Spot!" (feat. Jennie)**; GroovyRoom – "Yes or No" (feat. Huh Yunjin & Crush); Jay Park – "Taxi Blurr" (feat. Natty); Lee Young-ji – "Small Girl" (feat. D.O.); Sung Si-kyung & Naul – "Even for a Moment" |
| Best Music Video | Best Choreography |
| **Aespa – "Armageddon"**; IU – "Love Wins All"; Ive – "Heya"; K.Will – "No Sad Song for My Broken Heart"; Seventeen – "Maestro" | **Aespa – "Supernova"**; Illit – "Magnetic"; Le Sserafim – "Crazy"; NewJeans – "Supernatural"; Riize – "Impossible"; Taemin – "Guilty" |

=== Favorite awards ===
| Fans' Choice Top 10 – Male | Fans' Choice Top 10 – Female |
|---|---|
| **Enhypen**; **Jimin**; **Jung Kook**; **NCT Dream**; **RM**; **Seventeen**; **Stray Kids**; **Tomorrow X Together**; **V**; **Zerobaseone**; List of nominees: 8Turn; AB6IX; Astro; ATBO; Ateez; B1A4; Baekhyun; BamBam; B.D.U; Boynextdoor; Cravity; Day6; D.O.; Enhypen; Epex; Evnne; F.T. Island; Hui; J-Hope; Jimin; Jung Kook; Just B; Key; NCT 127; NCT Dream; NCT Wish; Oneus; P1Harmony; Plave; Riize; RM; Seventeen; Stray Kids; Super Junior; Taemin; Tempset; The Boyz; The New Six; TIOT; Treasure; TWS; Tomorrow X Together; V; WayV; Woodz; Xdinary Heroes; Xikers; Younite; Zerobaseone; Zico | **(G)I-dle**; **Aespa**; **Babymonster**; **IU**; **Ive**; **Jennie**; **Lee Young-ji**; **NewJeans**; **Twice**; **Unis**; List of nominees: (G)I-dle; Aespa; Artms; Babymonster; Badvillain; Bibi; Billlie; Blackswan; BoA; Choi Ye-na; Chungha; Classy; Craxy; Dreamcatcher; Everglow; Fifty Fifty; Fromis 9; H1-Key; Hwasa; Hyuna; Illit; Itzy; IU; Ive; Jennie; Jeon Somi; Kep1er; Kiss of Life; Kwon Eun-bi; Le Sserafim; Lee Young-ji; Lightsum; Meovv; Moonbyul; NewJeans; Nmixx; Oh My Girl; QWER; Red Velvet; STAYC; Sunmi; Taeyeon; TripleS; Twice; Unis; Viviz; Weeekly; Wheein; Wooah; Young Posse |
| Favorite Rising Artist | Favorite New Asian Artist |
| **Meovv** | **Me:I** |
| Favorite Male Group | Favorite Dance Performance – Male Group |
| **Treasure** | **BoyNextDoor** |
| Favorite Global Performer – Male | Favorite Global Performer – Female |
| **Riize** | **Ive** |
| Favorite Asian Artist | Favorite Global Trending Music |
| **INI** | **Byeon Woo-seok** |

=== Special awards ===
| Inspiring Achievement | Music Visionary of the Year |
|---|---|
| **J. Y. Park** | **G-Dragon** |
| CJ Global Performance | Global Sensation |
| **Ive**; **Zerobaseone** | **Bruno Mars**; **Rosé** |
| Olive Young K-Beauty Star in Music | PontaPass Global Favorite Artist |
| **Lee Young-ji** | **Tomorrow X Together** |
| Worldwide KCONER's Choice | Visa Super Stage |
| **Zerobaseone** | **Seventeen** |

== Artists with multiple awards ==
The following artist(s) received two or more awards:

| Count | Artist(s) |
|---|---|
| 6 | Aespa |
| 5 | Seventeen |
| 4 | Jennie |
| 3 | Ive |
| 3 | Jung Kook |
| 3 | Zerobaseone |
| 2 | (G)I-dle |
| 2 | IU |
| 2 | Jimin |
| 2 | Lee Young-ji |
| 2 | Tomorrow X Together |
| 2 | TWS |
| 2 | Zico |

== Broadcast ==
=== Chapter 1 US Red Carpet ===
| Region | Network |
|---|---|
| Worldwide (Note: Except regions specified in the table and countries where this program is unavailable on YouTube for rights restrictions) | YouTube (Mnet K-Pop, Mnet TV, M2 and KCON Official) & Mnet Plus |
| Japan | Mnet Smart+, Ponta Pass (Formerly au Smart Pass) |

=== Other Chapter (including Chapter 1 US Ceremony) ===
| Region | Network |
|---|---|
| Worldwide | YouTube (Mnet K-Pop, Mnet TV, M2 and KCON Official) & Mnet Plus |
| Various (Note: U.S; Canada, UK, France, Germany, Italy, Spain, Brazil and Mexico) | Samsung TV Plus (K-Pop by CJ ENM) |
| South Korea | Mnet, TVING, tvN Show, (Note: Only aired Japan ceremonies) Naver, CHZZK |
| Japan | Mnet Japan, Mnet Smart+, Ponta Pass (Formerly Au Smart Pass) |
| Vietnam | FPT Play |
| Thailand | TrueVisions Now, True X-Zyte |
| Singapore | tvN Asia, meWatch |
| Philippines | tvN Asia, Blast TV |
| Indonesia | tvN Asia, Trans TV (Live Show Highlights) |
| Malaysia | tvN Asia |
| Hong Kong | tvN Asia |
| Maldives | tvN Asia |
| Myanmar | tvN Asia |
| Taiwan | tvN Asia |
