= Fate ((G)I-dle song) =

2024 song by (G)I-dle

"Fate"

Song by (G)I-dle

from the album 2
- Released: January 29, 2024
- Studio: Cube Studio
- Genre: Funk; pop-punk
- Length: 2:42
- Label: Cube; Kakao
- Songwriters: Soyeon; Pop Time; Daily; Likey
- Producer: Soyeon

Live video
- "Fate" on YouTube

"Fate" (Korean: 나는 아픈 건 딱 질색이니까; RR: Naneun Apeun Geon Ttak Jilsaeginikka; lit. ''Because I hate being sick''), sometimes referred to as "Ah.Ttak.Jil" (Korean: 아.딱.질) in South Korea, is a song recorded by South Korean girl group (G)I-dle for their second studio album 2. It was released on January 29, 2024, as the album's sixth track. The song was written and produced by Soyeon, who also composed and arranged it alongside Pop Time, Daily, and Likey.

"Fate" is a pop-punk and funk hybrid song with influences from J-pop. It features guitars and vibrant, minimal production, including catchy piano sounds. The song emerged as a sleeper hit on South Korean music charts without any promotional efforts, reaching number one on the Circle Digital Chart and other South Korean streaming platforms. Later, it peaked at number five in Taiwan and at number 23 in Singapore's RIAS charts. It gained attention after the release of a stage video on Lee Hyori's Red Carpet and It's Live YouTube channel, accumulating over one million views.

Music critics praised the song's lyricism, funky production, and its nostalgic appeal. After acknowledging its growing popularity, (G)I-dle began promoting the song on South Korean music shows on March 21, 2024, starting with M Countdown. Although the group did not perform the song on Inkigayo, "Fate" achieved a Triple Crown. By November 2024, "Fate" was nominated for Song of the Year and won Best Vocal Performance at the MAMA Awards.

== Music and lyrics ==
"Fate" was written, composed and arranged by leader Soyeon, with additional contributions in composition and arrangement from Pop Time, Daily, and Likey. It is a blend of pop-punk and funk, featuring minimal yet vibrant production, guitars, and "jaunty" piano. NME noted that these elements give the song the bittersweet energy reminiscent of an end credits track from a slice-of-life anime series. Initially, Soyeon envisioned "Fate" as the lead single for the album. During an appearance on Lee Eun-ji's Song Plaza on January 30, 2024, she revealed, "I originally used 'Fate' as the title. It's a song with an animation feel." Soyeon crafted the song with a cartoon-like scene in mind, giving it a "band-like sound" instead of a typical dance track. Reporter Lee Deok-haeng of IZE magazine compares "Fate" to past song like "Allergy" (2023) and "Never Stop Me" (2022), highlighting (G)I-dle's consistent fusion of J-pop and band elements.

"'Fate' is a tune about the feeling of heartbreak that you suddenly get after bumping into a stranger. You don't remember who that person is, but you feel like you know him and you begin to shed tears."

— Soyeon explaining the meaning behind the lyrics, via – The Korea Times

The track revolves around the theme of an "unexpected yet fateful encounter", which captures the sudden heartbreak that follows a chance meeting with a stranger. The Fact reporter Choi Soo-bin noted that the track incorporated J-pop influences and resonates with listeners through relatable lyrics like "This morning again, with bread in my mouth/Starting the day the same/Iced Americano in one hand all day long/I'm so tired". Jang Jun-hwan of IZM praised Soyeon's skillful lyricism, which adeptly portrays various situations and emotions using relatable metaphors. Additionally, Jun-hwan highlighted the intuitive plot twists in the song.

== Release and reception ==
"Fate" is the sixth track on the group's second studio album 2, released on January 29, 2024. Despite not receiving any promotional backing from the agency, the song saw a revival on multiple South Korean music charts, achieving notable success. Securing iChart's "Perfect all-kill", it dominated the top spot on major South Korean music streaming service charts, marking their fourth consecutive success after "Tomboy", "Nxde", and "Queencard". Its popularity surged following the release of a stage video on the late-night music talk show Lee Hyori's Red Carpet and It's Live YouTube channel. These videos garnered over 1 million views, with shortened versions reaching 7 million views. A Cube Entertainment official attributed the song's success to the "members' passion and fans' support", noting Soyeon's songwriting and composing skills as key to showcasing the group's "unique sound".

The song also received positive reviews from South Korean music critics. In his album review, Jang Jun-hwan of IZM lauded "Fate" as a standout track, praising the lyricism, the funky guitar melodies and intuitive plot twists, likening the track's atmosphere to a youth cartoon, evoking sympathy and comfort in listeners. Reporter Lee Deok-haeng of IZE magazine praised "Fate" for its unique punk-based, minimal band sound and witty lyrics, evoking comparisons to J-pop or "Japanese animation OST material", and Miyeon's vocals. Additionally, he noted listener fatigue with (G)I-dle's conceptual title tracks like "Nxde" and "Super Lady", emphasizing "Fate's" departure from such artistic direction and reflecting a broader trend towards easy-listening tracks in the K-pop industry. Reporter Seung-gil Lee of My Daily praised (G)I-dle for departure from their usual style. Unlike their previous tracks known for their strong stage presence, he noted that "Fate" resonated with audiences through its light band sound and nostalgic melody reminiscent of youth movies. The song's airy atmosphere and poetic lyrics left a "lasting impression", contributing to its chart success. Renowned music critic Jeong Min-jae praised the song, describing its melody as fluid "like water" and its lyrics as narrative-driven. He noted the song's resurgence through spontaneous social media virality, marking it as a prime example of fan-driven rediscovery. Additionally, reporter Park So-jin of MK Sports pointed out that the song's nostalgic appeal stems from its resemblance to 2000s J-pop, attributing its allure to the unique melody and storytelling elements.

According to Genie Music's 2024 Annual Chart, "Fate" claimed the top spot. The song also secured second place on Melon's annual chart. Additionally, it held the number-one spot on the Tencent Music K-pop chart for 37 weeks in 2024, the longest of any song that year. The song peaked at numbers five and 23 on the Billboard Taiwan Songs and RIAS Singapore Regional charts, respectively.

== Live video ==
Following the song's unexpected success, (G)I-dle announced the release of a live video on March 13, 2024. The poster, which prominently features members Minnie and Yuqi, evokes a nostalgic atmosphere reminiscent of a youth movie. This nostalgic vibe has generated attention among netizens. The video emphasized their "bright visuals" in school uniforms, while they were surrounded by "fluttering flower petals added warmth, reminiscent of a scene from a youth movie", which left "a deep lingering impression." Following its release, "Fate" secured the top spot in South Korea's YouTube chart with 3.6 million views. The song has remained on the charts for five consecutive weeks.

== Accolades ==
(G)I-dle has decided to promote the song on South Korean music shows, starting with M Countdown on March 21, 2024. This decision resulted in an Inkigayo Triple Crown despite not appearing on said show. By November 2024, "Fate" was nominated for Song of the Year and won Best Vocal Performance at the MAMA Awards.

Awards and nominations for "Fate"
Award ceremony	Year	Category	Result	Ref.
MAMA Awards	2024	Song of the Year	Nominated	
MAMA Awards	2024	Best Vocal Performance	Won	
Melon Music Awards	2024	Song of the Year	Nominated	
Hanteo Music Awards	2025	Best Song	Won	
Golden Disc Awards	2025	Song of the Year	Nominated	
Golden Disc Awards	2025	Digital Song Bonsang	Won	

Music program awards for "Fate"
Program	Date	Ref.
Inkigayo	March 31, 2024	
Inkigayo	April 7, 2024	
Inkigayo	April 14, 2024	

== In popular culture ==
During the 2024 South Korean martial law crisis, the YouTube channel "Shinuihansu" created the AI-generated song "I Hate Impeachment", based on the original track "Fate". The modified version, featuring lyrics sung in president Yoon Suk Yeol's AI-generated voice, gained attention at pro-impeachment rallies organized by groups like the Candlelight Movement.

== Japanese version ==
"Fate" (Japanese ver.)

Single by I-dle

from the EP I-dle
- Released: September 26, 2025
- Studio: Cube Studio
- Genre: Funk; pop-punk
- Length: 2:42
- Label: Warner Music Japan
- Songwriters: Soyeon; Kanata Okajima; Pop Time; Daily; Likey
- Producer: Soyeon

I-dle singles chronology
"Good Thing" (2025)	"Fate" (Japanese ver.) (2025)	"Where Do We Go" (2025)

Lyric video
- "Fate" (Japanese ver.) on YouTube

The Japanese version of "Fate" was released on September 26, 2025, as a pre-release single from the group's first Japanese EP, I-dle, since their rebranding as I-dle.

=== Background and release ===
On August 4, 2025, the group announced that they would be releasing their first Japanese EP since rebranding as I-dle, titled I-dle, on October 3. It was revealed that the EP would include 3 original songs in Japanese, as well as Japanese versions of "Queencard" and "Fate". In support of the EP, the group was set to embark on their first Japanese concert tour since debut, kicking off on the following day. On August 16 and 17, prior to the EP's release, the group performed at the Summer Sonic festival in Osaka and Chiba, respectively. They surprise-performed "Fate" in Japanese as the ending song, revealing it ahead of release. On August 30, the EP's artwork and track listing were unveiled, revealing the Japanese title of "Fate" (傷つくのは嫌いだから, Kizutsuku No Wa Kiraidakara; lit. 'Because I hate getting hurt'). On September 26, a week prior to the EP's release, the Japanese version of "Fate" was pre-released, alongside a lyric video.

=== Chart performance ===
Weekly chart performance
Chart (2025)	Peak position
China Korean (TME)	41

== Credits and personnel ==
Credits adapted from CD liner notes.

Recording

- Recorded at Cube Studio
- Mixed at Klang Studios
- Audio edited at Ingrid Studio

Personnel

- (G)I-dle – vocals
  - Soyeon – producer, lyrics, composition, arrangement
- Kako – background vocals
- Pop Time – keyboard, composition, arrangement
- Daily – keyboard, composition, arrangement
- Ryo – guitar
- Choi Ye-ji – recording engineer
- Jeong Eun-kyung – digital editing
- Kang Sun-young – engineer
- Gu Jong-pil – mixing engineer
- Kwon Nam-woo – mastering engineer
- Yoo Eun-jin – assistant mastering engineer

== Charts ==
=== Weekly charts ===
Weekly chart performance
Chart (2024)	Peak position
China Korean (TME)	1
Global 200 (Billboard)	95
Singapore Regional (RIAS)	23
South Korea (Circle)	1
Taiwan (Billboard)	5

=== Monthly charts ===
Monthly chart performance
Chart (2024)	Position
South Korea (Circle)	2

=== Year-end charts ===
Year-end chart performance
Chart	Year	Position
South Korea (Circle)	2024	4
South Korea (Circle)	2025	62

== Certifications ==
Certifications
Region	Certification	Certified units/sales
Streaming
South Korea (KMCA)	Platinum	100,000,000^{†}
^{†} Streaming-only figures based on certification alone.
