= MAMA Award for Best Vocal Performance =

Annual music award

MAMA Award for Best Vocal Performance – Solo or Group
- Awarded for: Quality vocal performance
- Country: South Korea
- Presented by: CJ E&M Pictures (Mnet)
- First award: 2010
- Currently held by: Davichi – "Stitching"; Rosé – "Toxic Till the End" (2025)
- Website: MAMA Awards

The MAMA Award for Best Male / Female Vocal Performance – Solo or Group (베스트 보컬 퍼포먼스 (솔로/그룹 – 남자/여자)) is an award presented annually by CJ E&M Pictures (Mnet).

It was first awarded at the 12th Mnet Asian Music Awards ceremony held in 2010; Gummy and 2AM won the awards for their vocal performance in "Because You're a Man" and "Can't Let You Go Even If I Die" respectively, and it is given in honor for the artist/s with the best vocal performance in the music industry.

== History ==
| Year(s) | Best Solo | | | Best Group | | | Best Solo/Group | | |
| Year(s) | Male | Female | Combined | Male | Female | Combined | Male | Female | Combined |
|---|---|---|---|---|---|---|---|---|---|
| 2010–2012 | | | check | | | check | | | |
| 2013–2017 | | | | | | | check | check | |
| 2018–2020 | | | check | | | check | | | |
| 2021 | | | | | | | | | check |
| 2022–2025 | | | check | | | check | | | |

== Winners and nominees ==
| Year | Performing artist(s) | Work | List of nominees |
|---|---|---|---|
| 2010 | Gummy | "Because You're a Man" | Nominees: K.Will – "Miss Miss Miss"; Seo In-young – "You Write It As Love and Call It Pain"; Jung-in – "Hate"; Wheesung – "I Thought of Marriage" |
| 2010 | 2AM | "Can't Let You Go Even If I Die" | Nominees: 4Men – "Can't"; 8Eight – "Break Up Is Coming"; Vibe – "Come Back"; Davichi – "Time Please Stop" |
| 2011 | IU | "Good Day" | Nominees: Kim Gun-mo – "It's Sadder Than the Yesterday"; Lee Hyun – "You Are the Best of My Life"; Huh Gak – "Hello"; K.Will – "My Heart Beating" |
| 2011 | 2NE1 | "Lonely" | Nominees: Davichi – "Don't Say Goodbye"; Sistar19 – "Ma Boy"; 2AM – You Wouldn't Answer My Calls"; 4Men – "Once While Living" |
| 2012 | K.Will | "I Need You" | Nominees: Baek Ji-young – "Voice"; IU – "You & I"; John Park – "Falling"; Huh Gak – "The Person Who Once Loved Me" |
| 2012 | Davichi | "Will Think of You" | Nominees: 2AM – "I Wonder If You Hurt Like Me"; Noel – "I Miss You"; Urban Zakapa – "I Hate You"; 4Men – "The Man, The Woman" |
| 2013 | Lee Seung-gi | "Return" | Nominees: 2AM – "One Spring Day"; Lee Seung-chul – "My Love"; Cho Yong-pil – "Bounce"; K.Will – "Love Blossom" |
| 2013 | Ailee | "U&I" | Nominees: Davichi – "Turtle"; Lyn – "Breakable Heart"; IU – "The Red Shoes"; Lee Hi – "1,2,3,4" |
| 2014 | Taeyang | "Eyes, Nose, Lips" | Nominees: Kim Dong-ryool – "How I Am"; K.Will – "Day 1"; Roy Kim – "Home"; Wheesung – "Night And Day" |
| 2014 | Ailee | "Singing Got Better" | Nominees: Baek Ji-young – "Fervor"; IU – "Friday"; Lee Sun-hee – "Meet Him Among"; Younha – "Umbrella" |
| 2015 | Zion.T | "Eat" | Nominees: SG Wannabe – "Love You"; Kyuhyun – "At Gwanghwamun"; Im Chang-jung – "Love Again"; Huh Gak – "Snow of April" |
| 2015 | Ailee | "Mind Your Own Business" | Nominees: Davichi – "Cry Again"; Mamamoo – "Um Oh Ah Yeh"; Baek A-yeon – "Shouldn't Have"; Taeyeon – "I" |
| 2016 | Crush | "Don't Forget" (ft. Taeyeon) | Nominees: Dean – "D (Half Moon)"; Eric Nam – "Good For You"; Im Chang-jung – "The Love That I Committed"; Jang Beom-june – "Fallen in Love (Only with You)" |
| 2016 | Ailee | "If You" | Nominees: Baek A-yeon – "So-So"; Baek Ye-rin – "Across The Universe"; Jung Eun-ji – "Hopefully Sky"; Taeyeon – "Rain" |
| 2016 | Davichi | "Beside Me" | Nominees: Mamamoo – "You're the Best"; Beast – "Ribbon"; BtoB – "Remember That"; Urban Zakapa – "I Don't Love You" |
| 2017 | Yoon Jong-shin | "Like It" | Nominees: Zion.T – "The Song"; Jung Seung-hwan – "This Fool"; Han Dong-geun – "Crazy"; Hwang Chi-yeul – "A Daily Song" |
| 2017 | Heize | "You, Clouds, Rain" | Nominees: Kim Se-jeong – "Flower Way"; Suran – "Wine"; IU – "Through The Night"; Jung Eun-ji – "The Spring" |
| 2017 | Bolbbalgan4 | "Tell Me You Love Me" | Nominees: BtoB – "Missing You"; Highlight – "Calling You"; Winner – "Really Really"; Mamamoo – "Yes I Am" |
| 2018 | iKon | "Love Scenario" | Nominees: Mamamoo – "Starry Night"; BtoB – "Only One For Me"; MeloMance – "Tale"; Bolbbalgan4 – "Travel" |
| 2018 | Heize | "Didn't Know Me" | Nominees: Roy Kim – "Only Then"; Park Hyo-shin – "Sound of Winter"; Im Chang-jung – "There Has Never Been A Day I Haven't Loved You"; Jung Seung-hwan – "The Snowman" |
| 2019 | Bolbbalgan4 | "Bom" | Nominees: Mamamoo – "Gogobebe"; AKMU – "How Can I Love the Heartbreak, You're the One I Love"; Davichi – "Unspoken Words"; BtoB – "Beautiful Pain"; Winner – "Millions" |
| 2019 | Taeyeon | "Four Seasons" | Nominees: Park Bom – "Spring" (feat. Sandara Park); Kim Jae-hwan – "Begin Again"; Ben – "180 Degree"; Jang Beom-jun – "Karaoke"; Chen – "Beautiful Goodbye" |
| 2020 | Mamamoo | "Hip" | Nominees: Winner – "Hold"; Noel – "Late Night"; NU'EST – "I'm In Trouble"; Davichi – "Dear" |
| 2020 | IU | "Blueming" | Nominees: Baek Ye-rin – "Square"; Baekhyun – "Candy"; Jung Seung-hwan – "My Christmas Wish"; Taeyeon – "Spark" |
| 2021 | IU | "Celebrity" | Nominees: AKMU – "Nakka" (with IU); Davichi – "Just Hug Me"; Heize – "Happen"; Lee Mu-jin – "Traffic Light" |
| 2022 | Big Bang | "Still Life" | Nominees: BTS – "Yet to Come (The Most Beautiful Moment)"; Davichi – "Fanfare"; Enhypen – "Polaroid Love"; Winner – "I Love U" |
| 2022 | Taeyeon | "INVU" | Nominees: IU – "Drama"; Kim Min-seok – "Drunken Confession"; Lee Mu-jin – "When It Snows" (featuring Heize); Lim Young-woong – "Our Blues, Our Life" |
| 2023 | AKMU | "Love Lee" | Nominees: BTOB – "Wind and Wish"; BTS – "Take Two"; MC the Max – "Eternity"; MeloMance – "A Shining Day" |
| 2023 | Parc Jae-jung | "Let's Say Goodbye ( 헤어지자 말해요 )" | Nominees: Dawn – "Dear My Light"; Lee Mu-jin – "Ordinary Confession"; Lim Young-woong – "London Boy"; V – "Love Me Again" |
| 2024 | (G)I-dle | "Fate" | Nominees: AKMU – "Hero"; Davichi – "A Very Personal Story"; Plave – "Way 4 Luv"; Red Velvet – "Cosmic" |
| 2024 | Bibi | "Bam Yang Gang" | Nominees: IU – "Love Wins All"; Lee Mu-jin – "Episode"; Lim Young-woong – "Warmth"; Taeyeon – "To. X" |
| 2025 | Davichi | "Stitching" | Nominees: Highlight – "Endless Ending"; Meovv – "Drop Top"; Treasure – "Yellow"; Zerobaseone – "Doctor! Doctor!" |
| 2025 | Rosé | "Toxic Till the End" | Nominees: Doyoung – "Memory"; Lee Mu-jin – "Coming of Age Story"; Roy Kim – "If You Ask Me What Love Is"; Taeyeon – "Letter to Myself" |

== Multiple awards ==
4 awards

- Ailee

3 awards

- IU
- Davichi

2 awards

- Heize
- Bolbbalgan4
- Taeyeon

== Gallery of winners ==
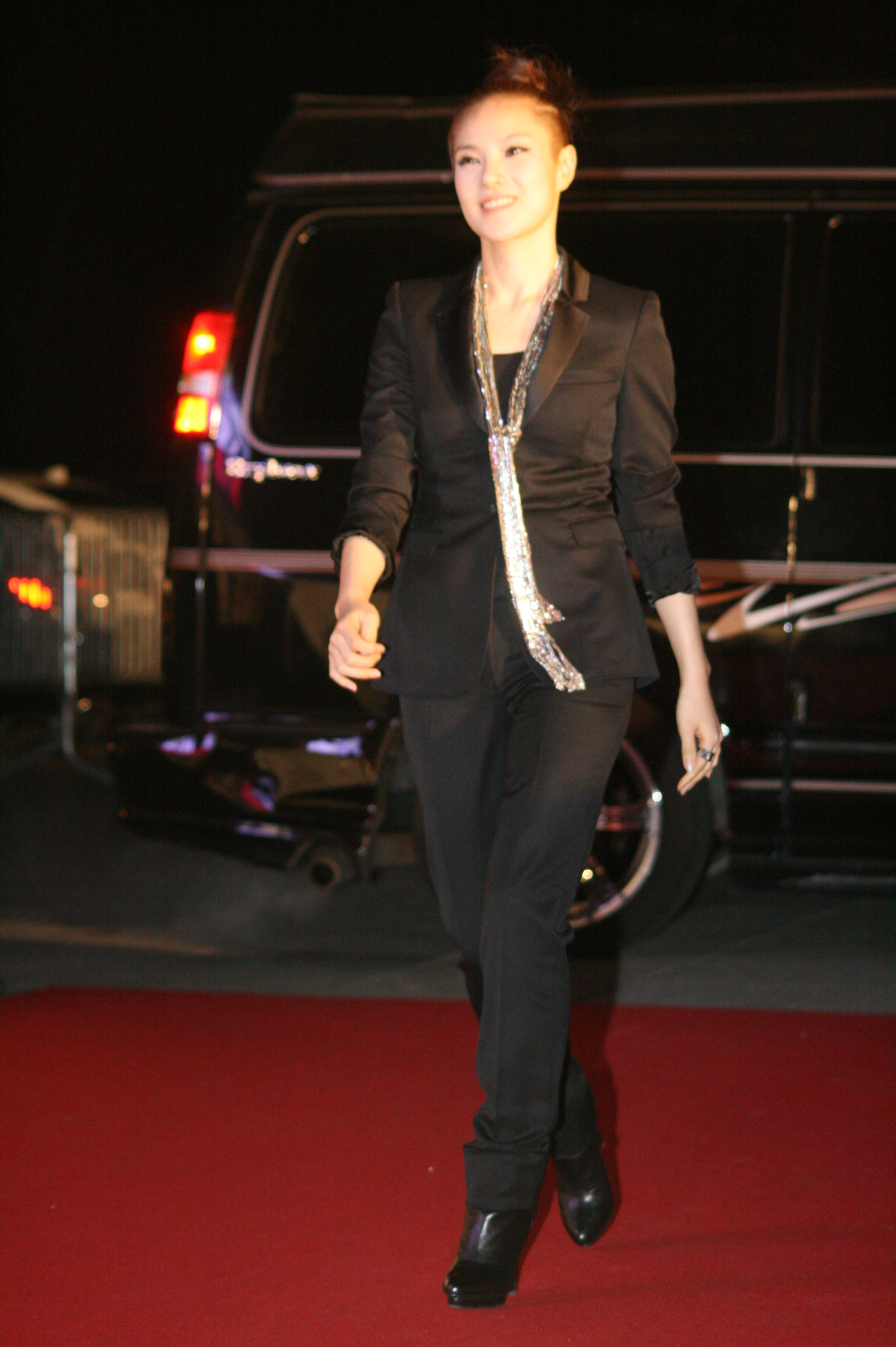
Gummy, (2010)

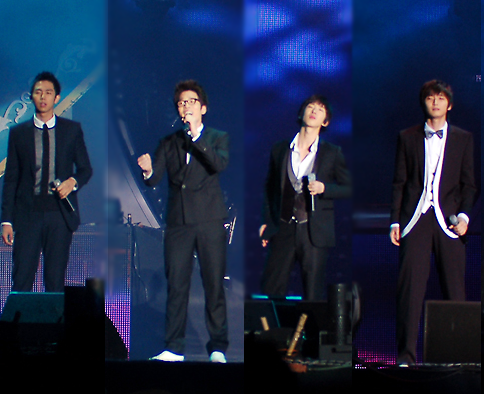
2AM, (2010)

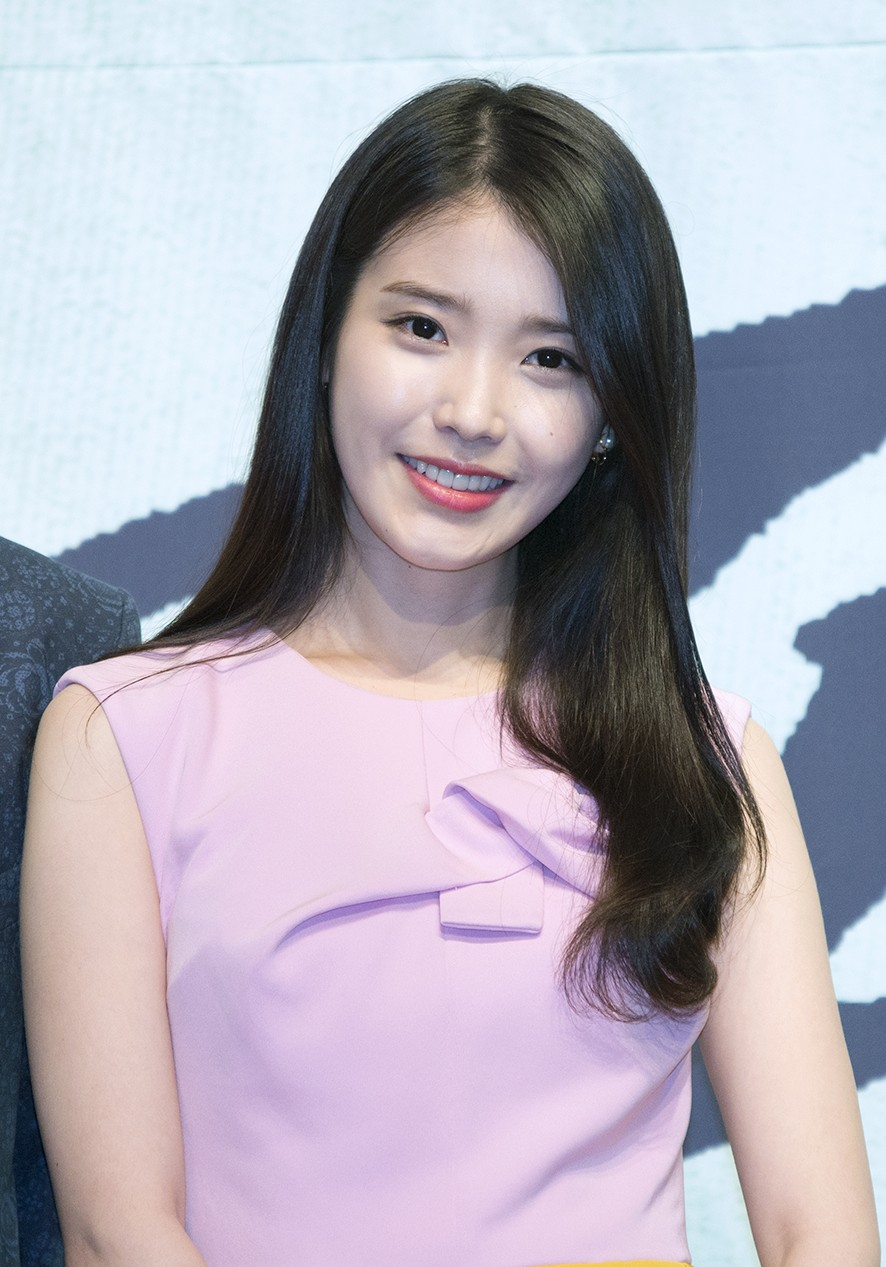
IU, (2011, 2020–21)

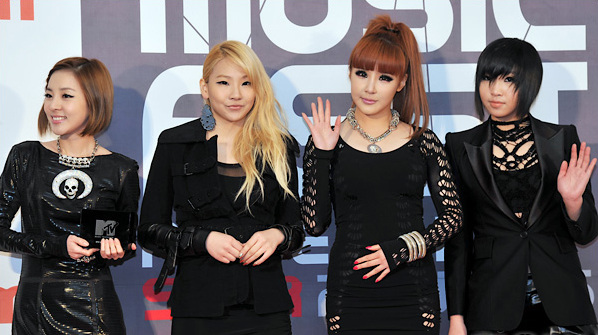
2NE1, (2011)

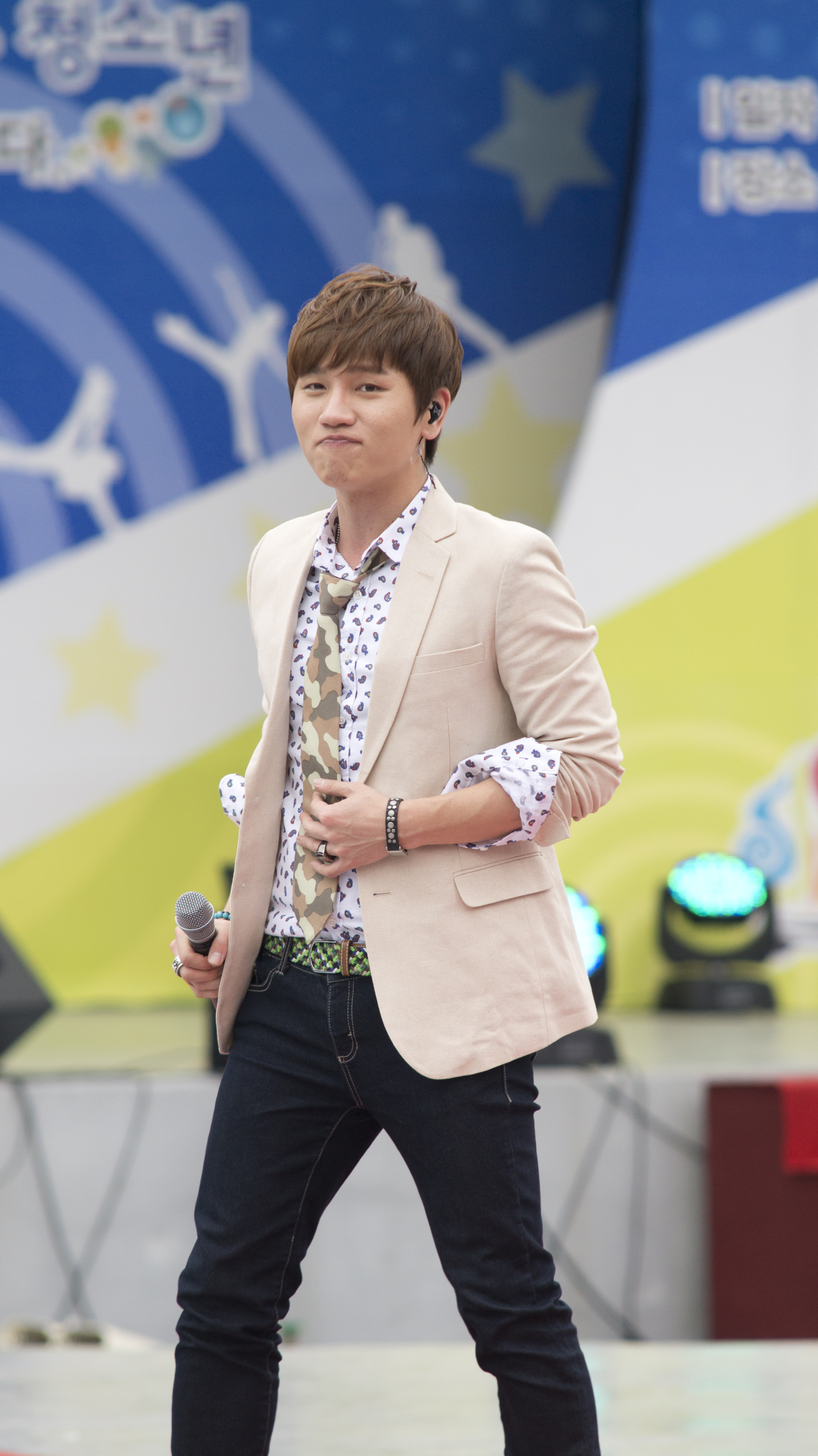
K.Will, (2012)

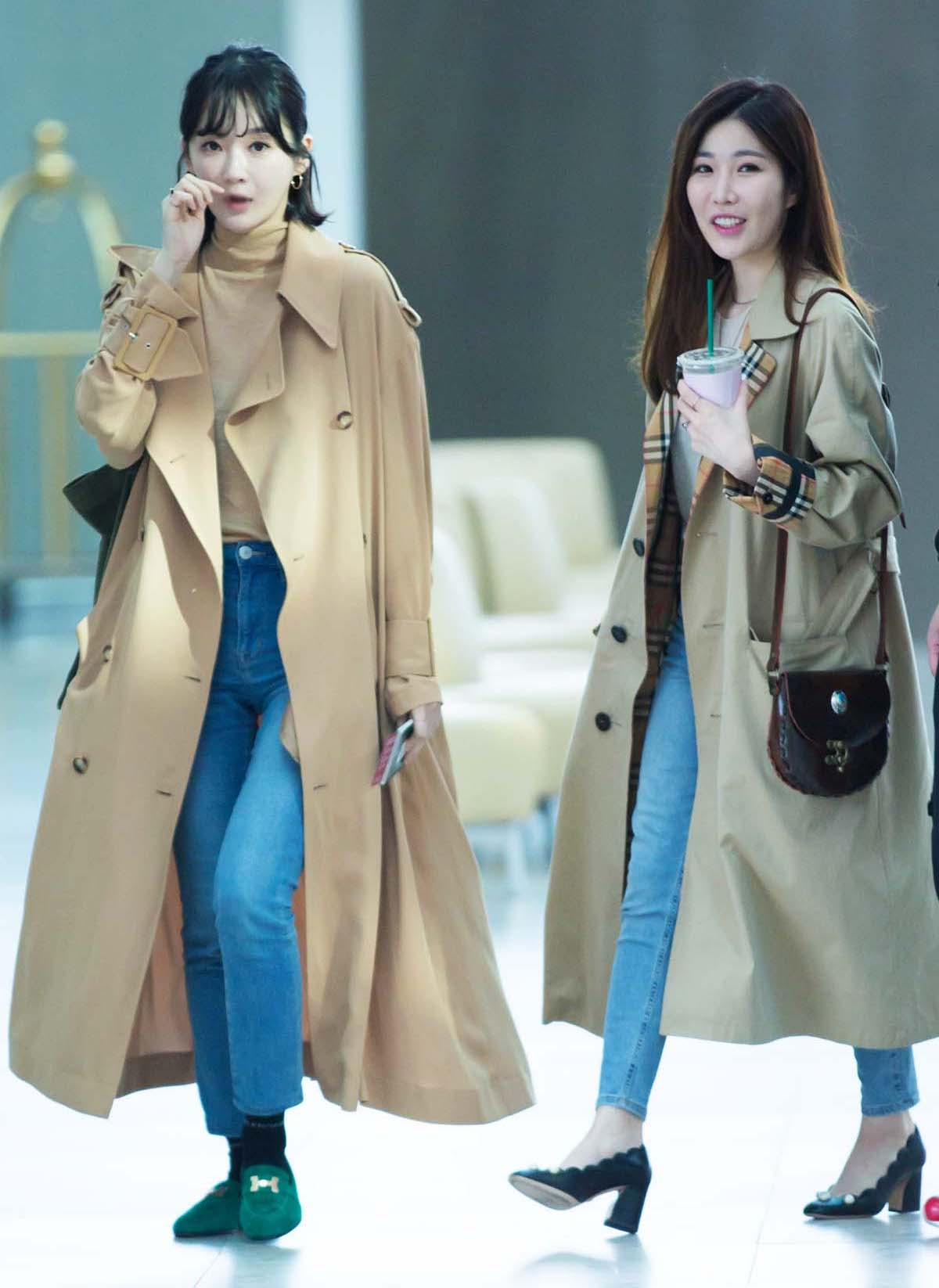
Davichi, (2012, 2016, 2025)

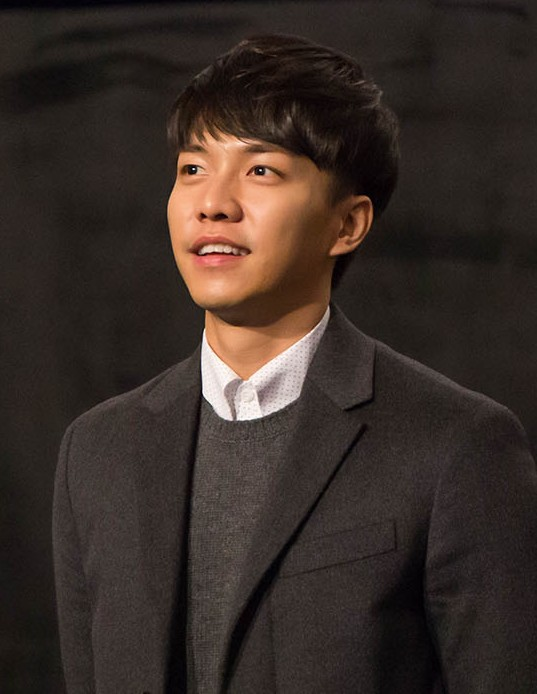
Lee Seung-gi, (2013)

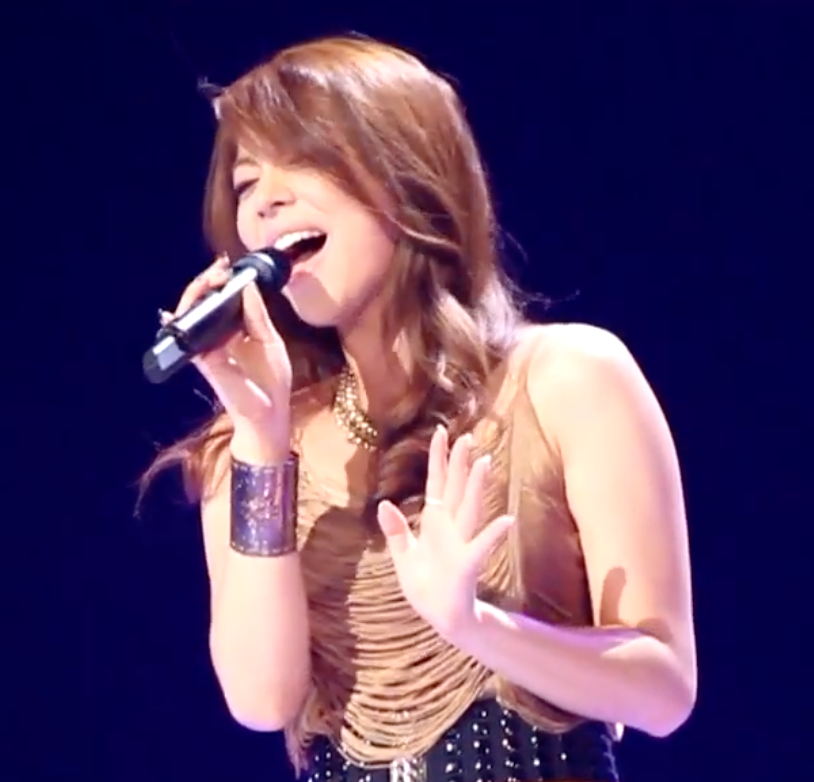
Ailee, (2013–16)

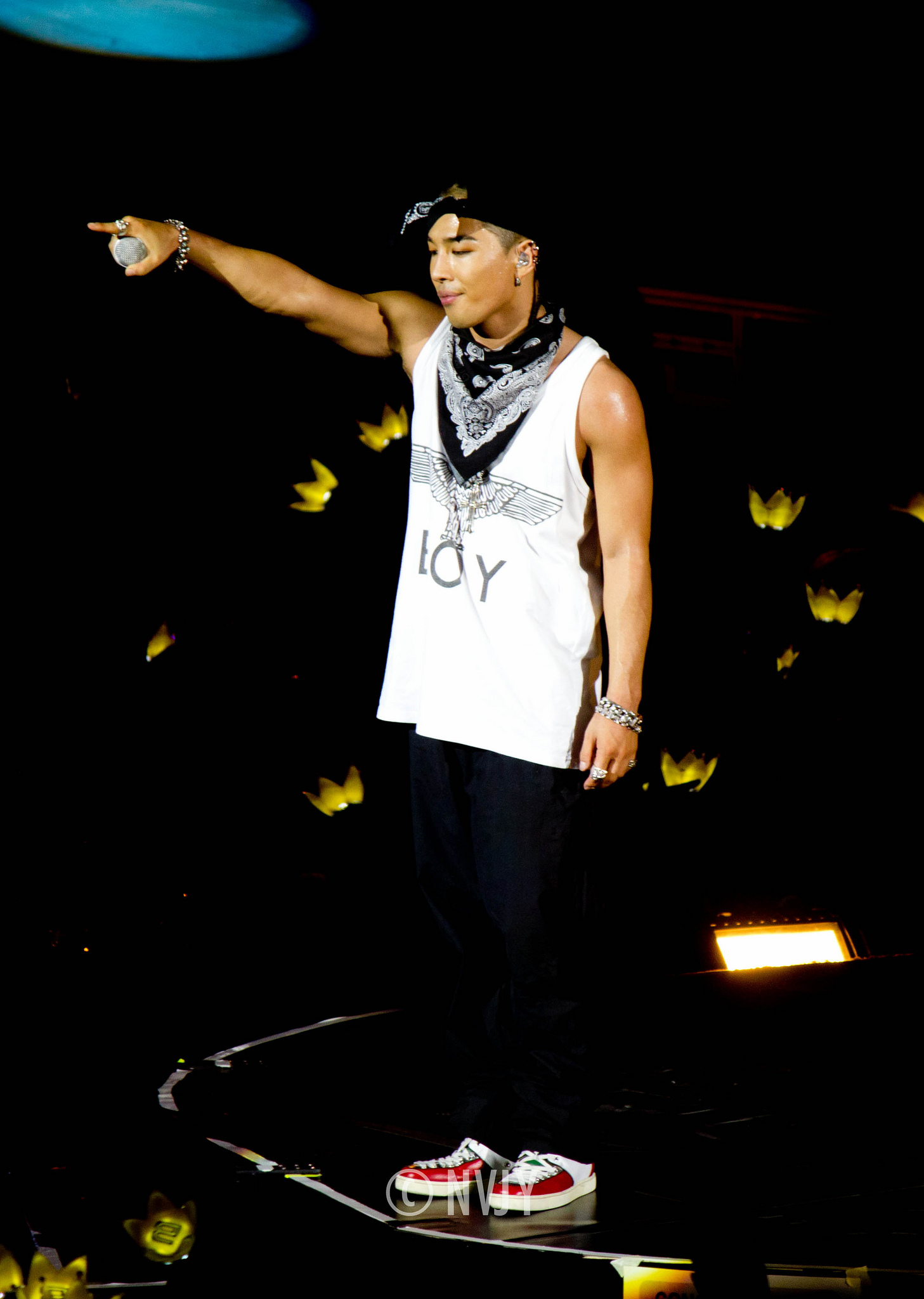
Taeyang, (2014)

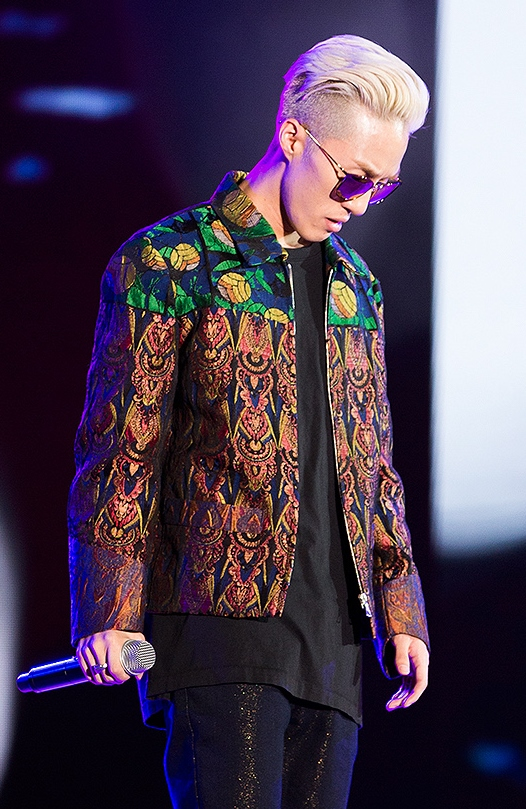
Zion.T, (2015)

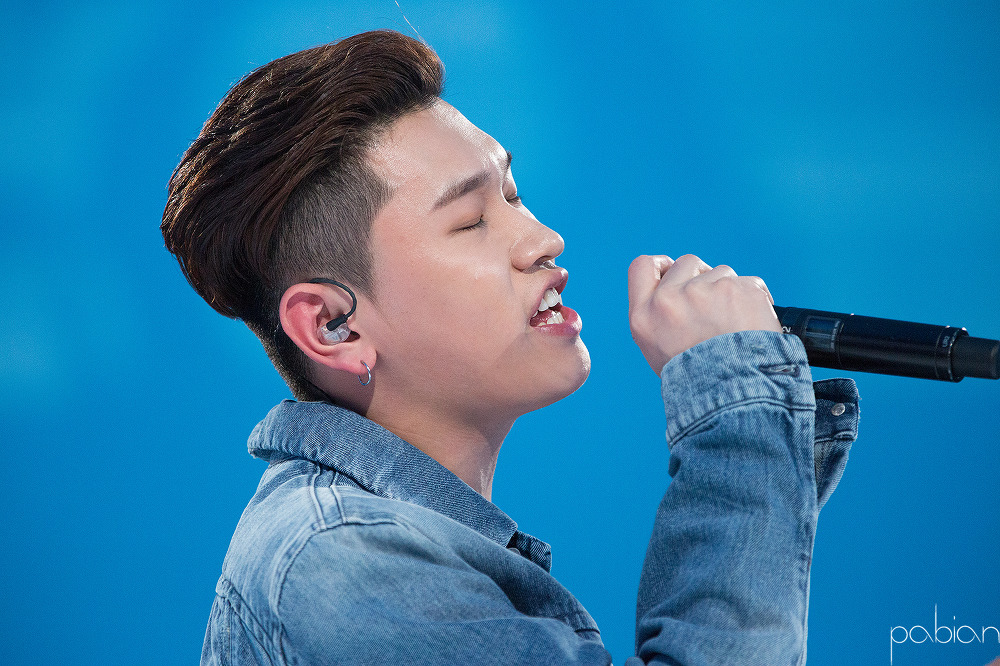
Crush, (2016)

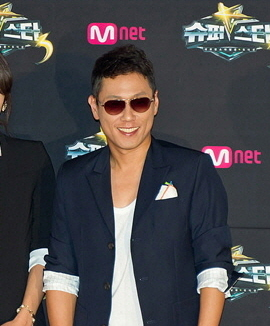
Yoon Jong-shin, (2017)

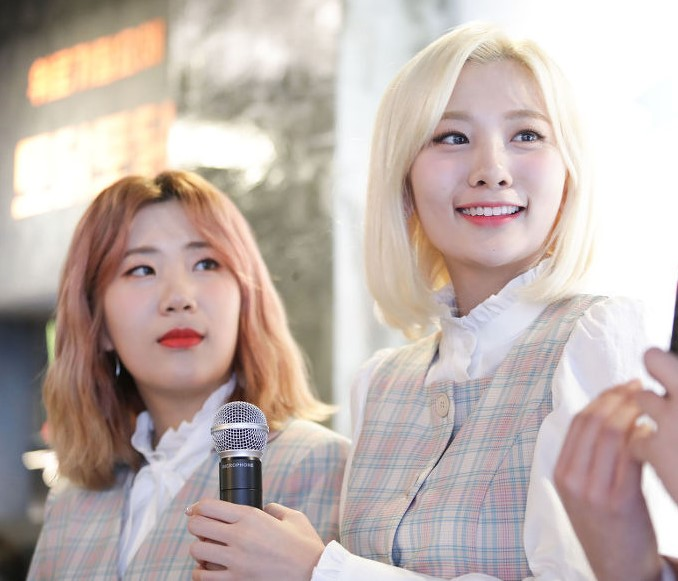
Bolbbalgan4, (2017, 2019)

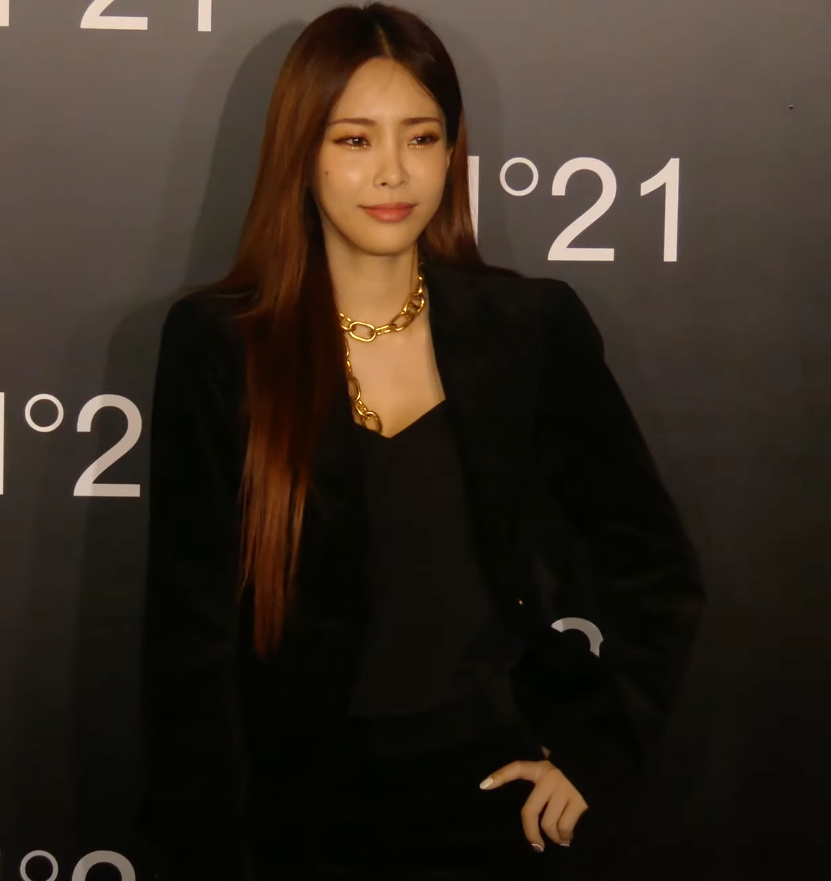
Heize, (2017–18)

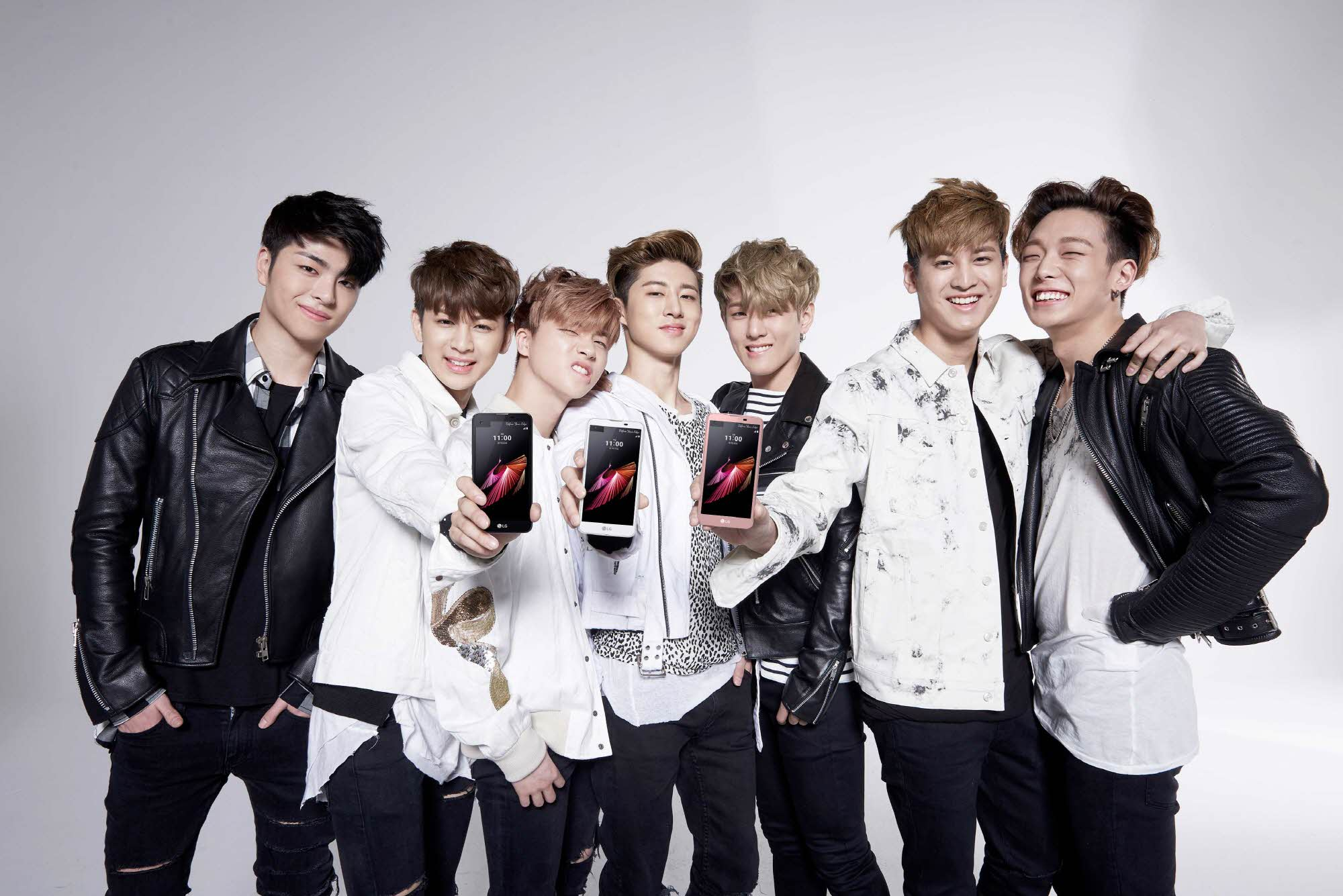
iKon, (2018)

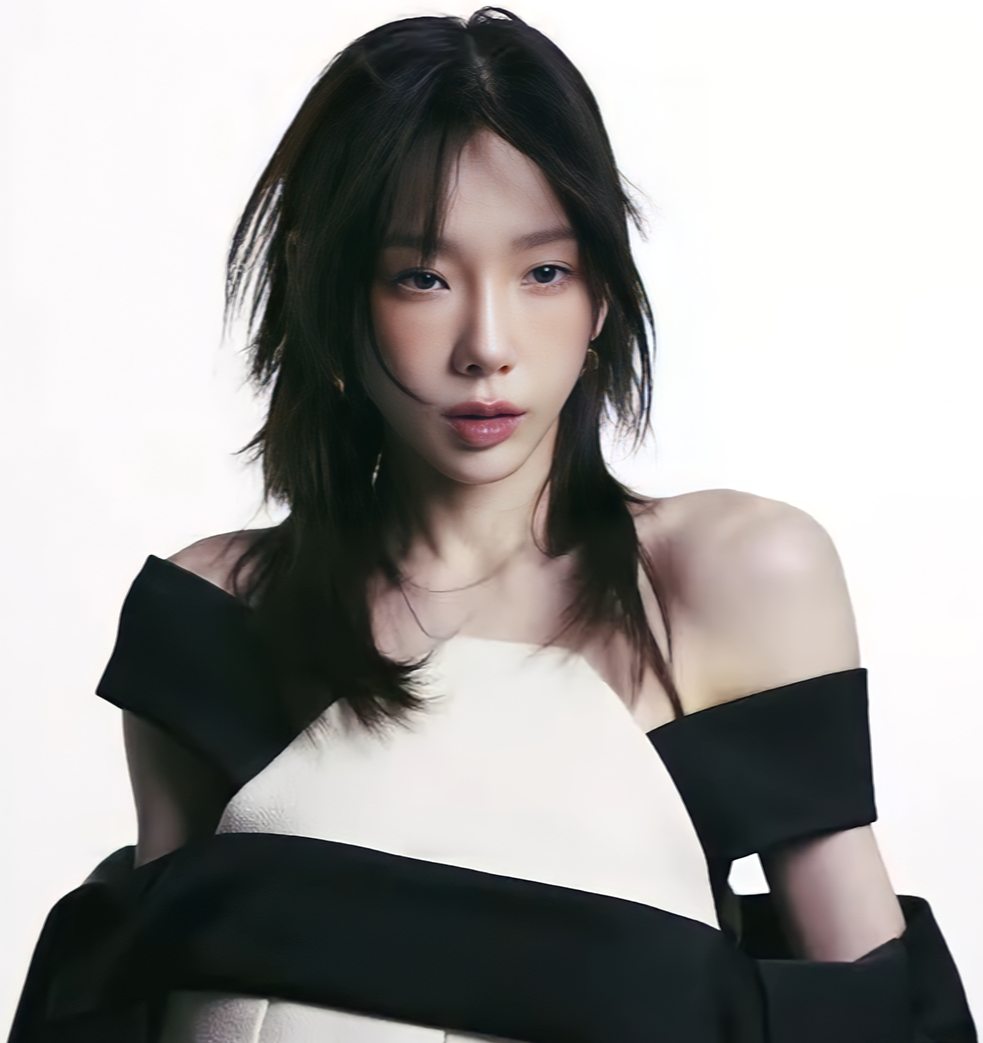
Taeyeon, (2019, 2022)

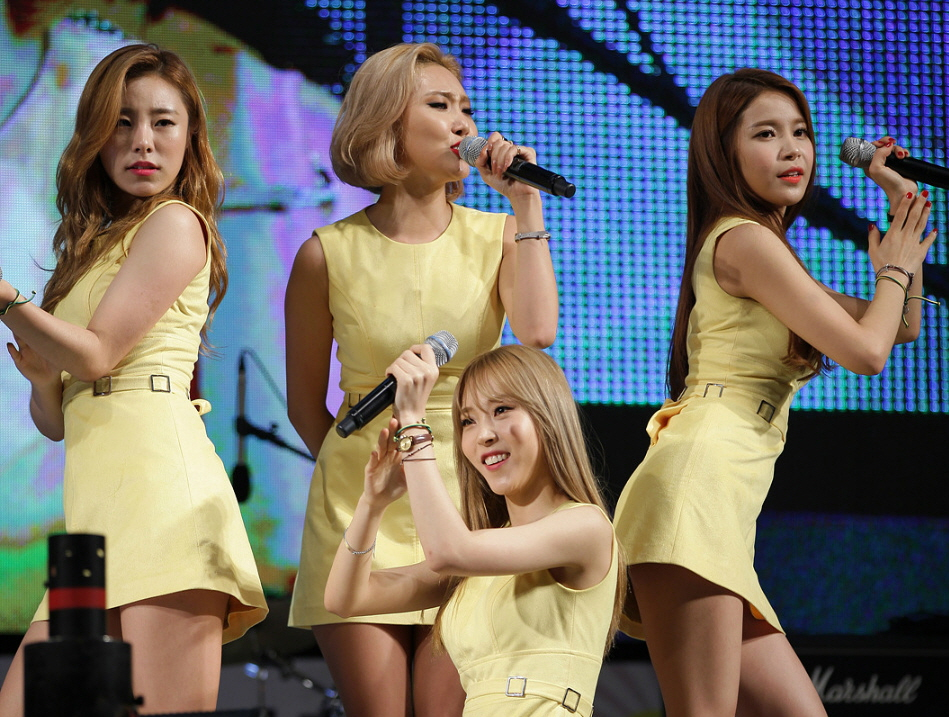
Mamamoo, (2020)

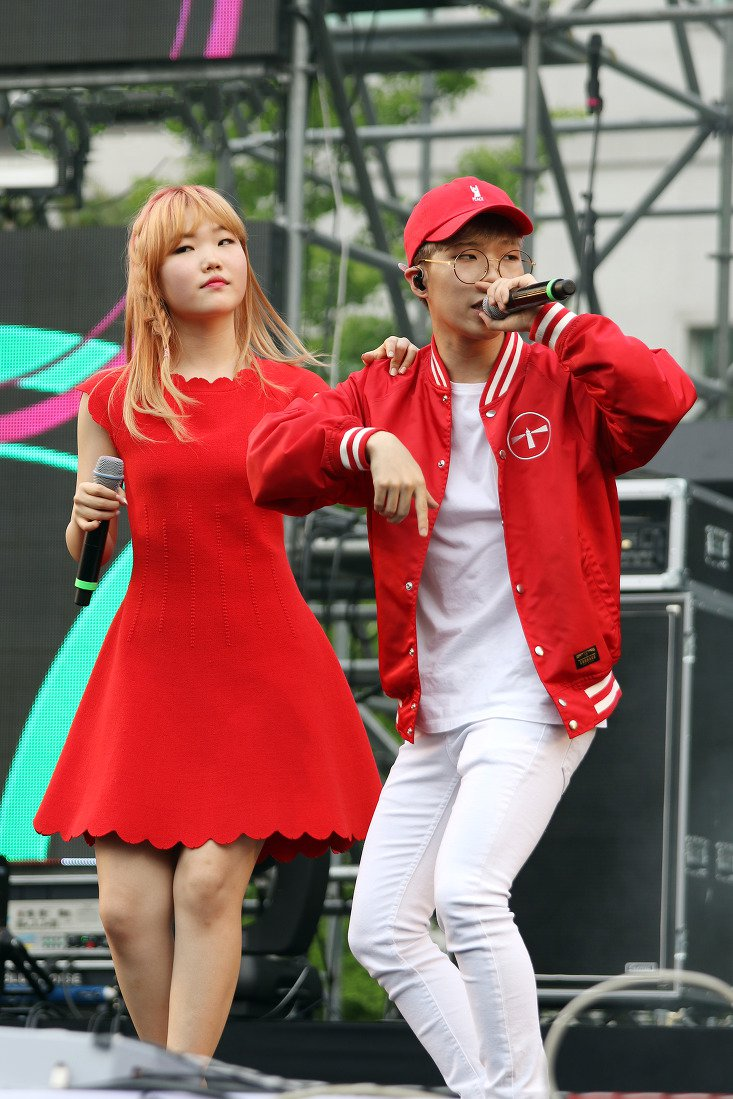
AKMU, (2023)

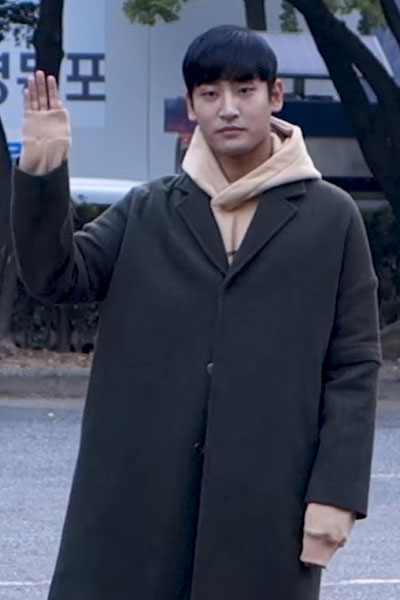
Parc Jae-jung, (2023)

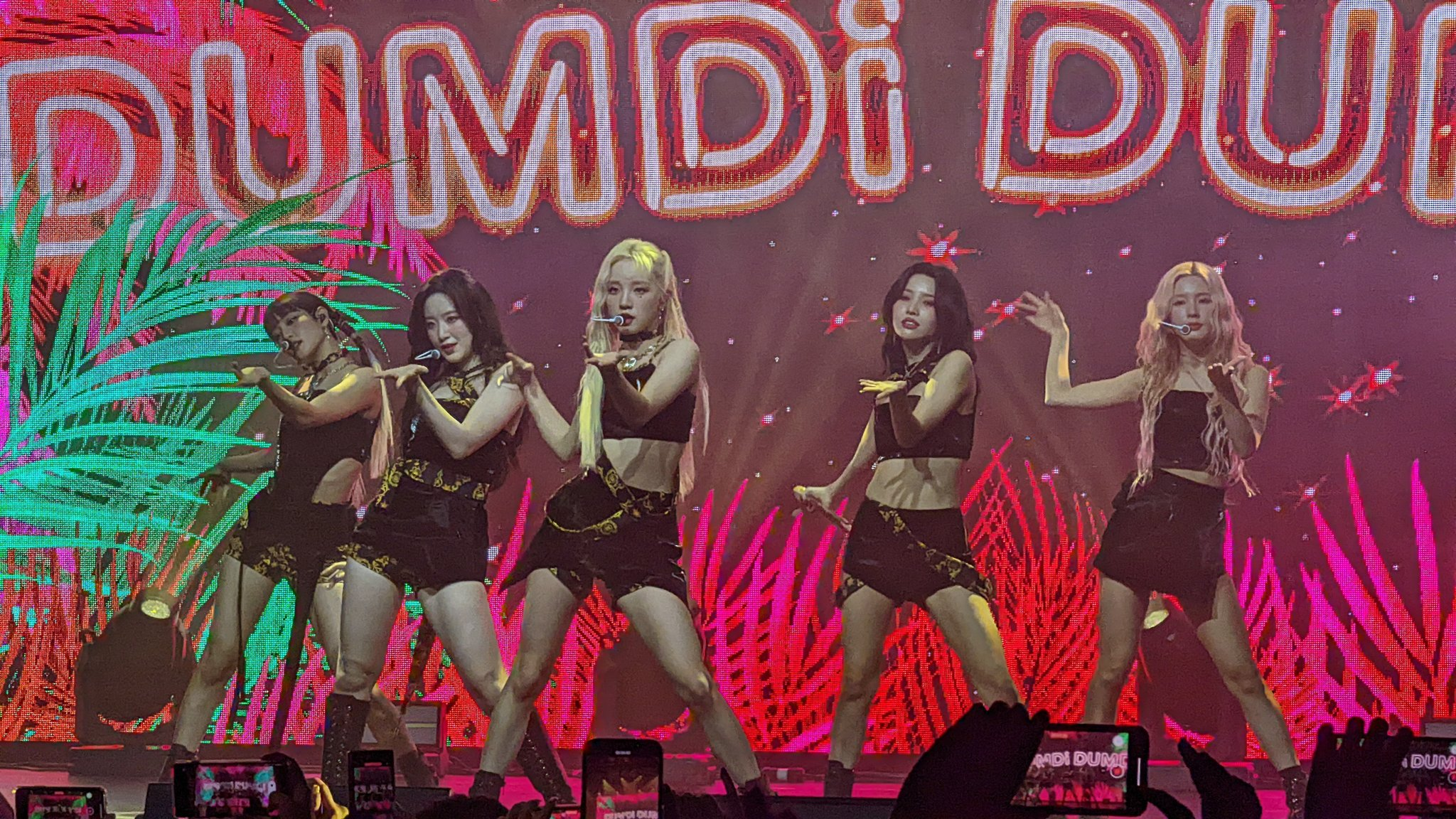
(G)I-dle, (2024)

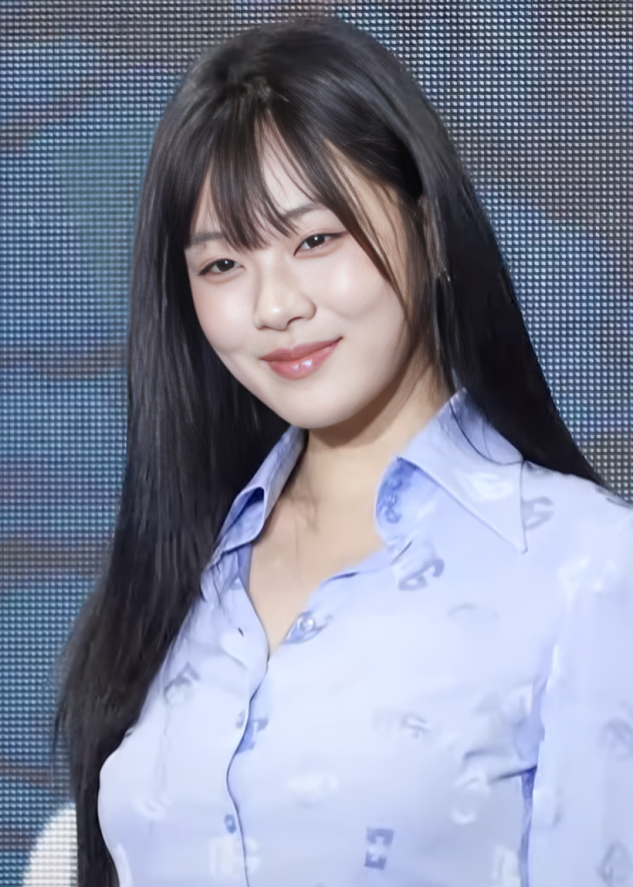
Bibi, (2024)

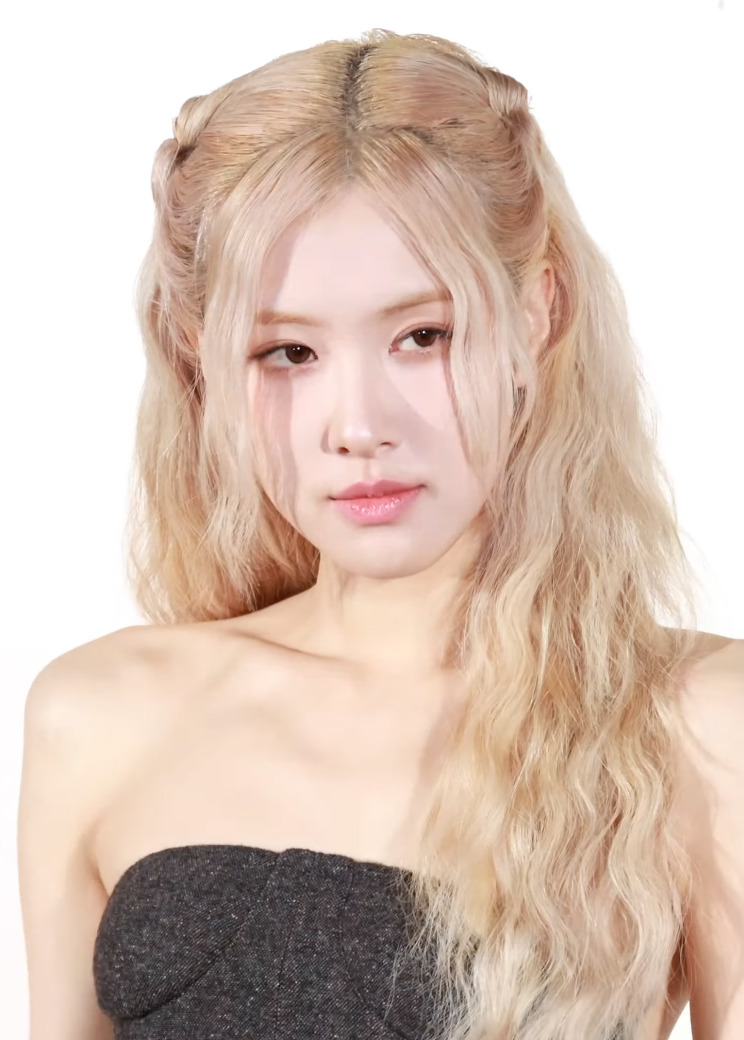
Rosé, (2025)
