= Wife (song) =

Single by (G)I-dle

from the album 2
- Language: Korean
- Released: January 22, 2024
- Genre: Bubblegum pop
- Length: 2:01
- Label: Cube; Kakao
- Composers: Soyeon; Pop Time; Daily; Likey
- Lyricist: Soyeon

(G)I-dle singles chronology
| "I Want That" (2023) | "Wife" (2024) | "Super Lady" (2024) |

Music video
- "Wife" on YouTube

"Wife" is a song recorded by South Korean girl group (G)I-dle for their second studio album 2. It was released as the album's pre-released single by Cube Entertainment on January 22, 2024. Written by Soyeon, Pop Time, Daily and Likey, a bubblegum and pop track serves as a double entendre manifesto, playfully mocking societal norms surrounding traditional wife roles while intertwining sexually suggestive lyrics.

== Background and release ==
On January 8, 2024, Cube Entertainment announced (G)I-dle would be releasing their second studio album titled 2 on January 29. Four days later, a comeback trailer was released. On January 13, the promotional schedule was released. On January 21, the music video teaser for "Wife" was released. A day later, "Wife" was released alongside its music video.

== Music and lyrics ==
"Wife" was written and composed by Soyeon in the key of B minor with a tempo of 124 beats per minute. Described as bubblegum bass-based pop song with "bold" lyrics that "attracts attention with metaphorical but explicit" imagery. Serving as a manifesto on "cooking" and "cleaning," the song cleverly mocks the stereotype of "the wife" through highly suggestive lyrics imbued with sexual undertones.

== Controversy ==
After the release of "Wife", a debate erupted among netizens regarding its lyrics. Some argued that it evoked explicit sexual imagery, while others saw it as a portrayal of freedom of expression, depicting an independent woman "who refuses to conform to passive wife stereotypes". The song's controversial content led to discussions among South Korean music broadcasters about its suitability for airing. While SBS and MBC deemed it appropriate, KBS ruled it unsuitable because of its suggestive content. Despite KBS's decision on January 25, Cube Entertainment declined to seek reconsideration, stating that "'Wife' doesn't align with the group's broadcasting endeavors [hence] they won't alter the song lyrics based on Jeon So-yeon's decision, affirming her commitment to artistic expression".

== Credits and personnel ==
Recording

- Recorded at Cube Studios (Seoul)
- Mixed at Klang Studio (Seoul)
- Mastered at 821 Sound Mastering (Seoul)

Personnel

- (G)I-dle – vocals
  - Soyeon – songwriter, arranger, producer
- Daily – songwriter, arranger, keyboards
- Likey – songwriter, arranger
- Pop Time – songwriter, arranger, keyboards
- Ryo – guitar
- Shin Jae Bin – recording engineer
- Kang Sun Young – engineer
- Jeong Eun Kyung – digital editing
- JongPil Gu – mixing engineer
- Kwon Nam Woo – mastering engineer
- Yoo Eun Jin – assistant mastering engineer

== Charts ==
=== Weekly charts ===
Weekly chart performance for "Wife"
| Chart (2024) | Peak position |
|---|---|
| China Korean (TME) | 23 |
| Global 200 (Billboard) | 92 |
| Hong Kong (Billboard) | 13 |
| Malaysia International (RIM) | 18 |
| Singapore Regional (RIAS) | 11 |
| South Korea (Circle) | 11 |
| Taiwan (Billboard) | 2 |

=== Monthly charts ===
Monthly chart performance for "Wife"
| Chart (2024) | Position |
|---|---|
| South Korea (Circle) | 12 |

=== Year-end charts ===
Year-end chart performance for "Wife"
| Chart (2024) | Position |
|---|---|
| South Korea (Circle) | 97 |
