= All(H)Ours =

South Korean boy band

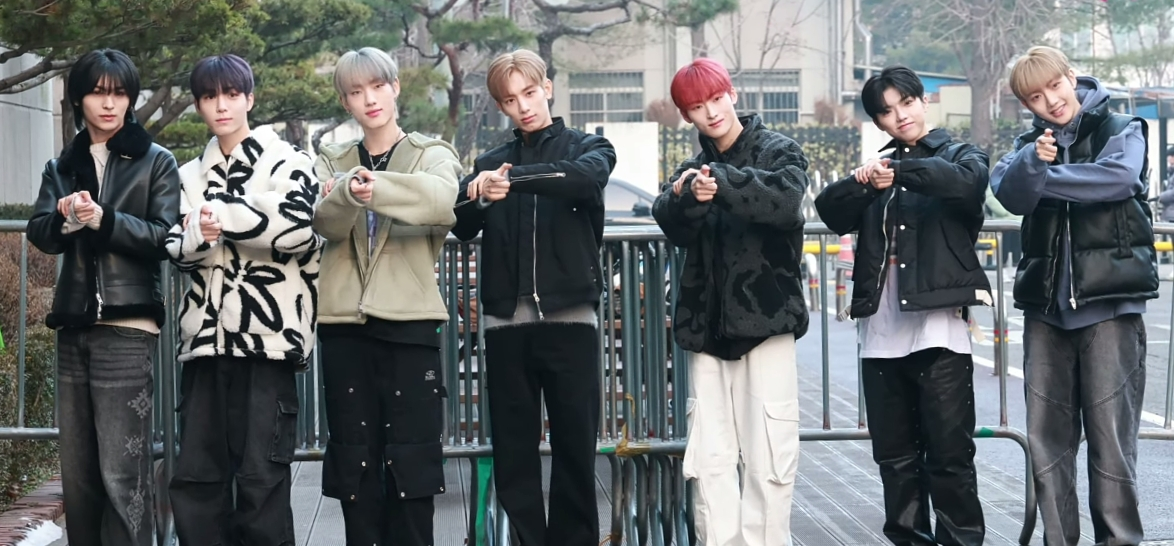
- All(H)Ours in January 2024; L–R: Masami, Minje, Xayden, Kunho, Youmin, On:N and Hyunbin

Background information
- Origin: Seoul, South Korea
- Genre: K-pop
- Years active: 2024–present
- Label: Eden
- Members: Kunho; Youmin; Xayden; Minje; Masami; Hyunbin; On:N
- Website: edenenter.com/all(h)ours

All(H)Ours (Korean: 올아워즈; stylized in all caps) is a South Korean boy band formed and managed by Eden Entertainment. The group consists of seven members: Kunho, Youmin, Xayden, Minje, Masami, Hyunbin, and On:N. They debuted on January 10, 2024, with the extended play (EP) All Ours.

== Name ==
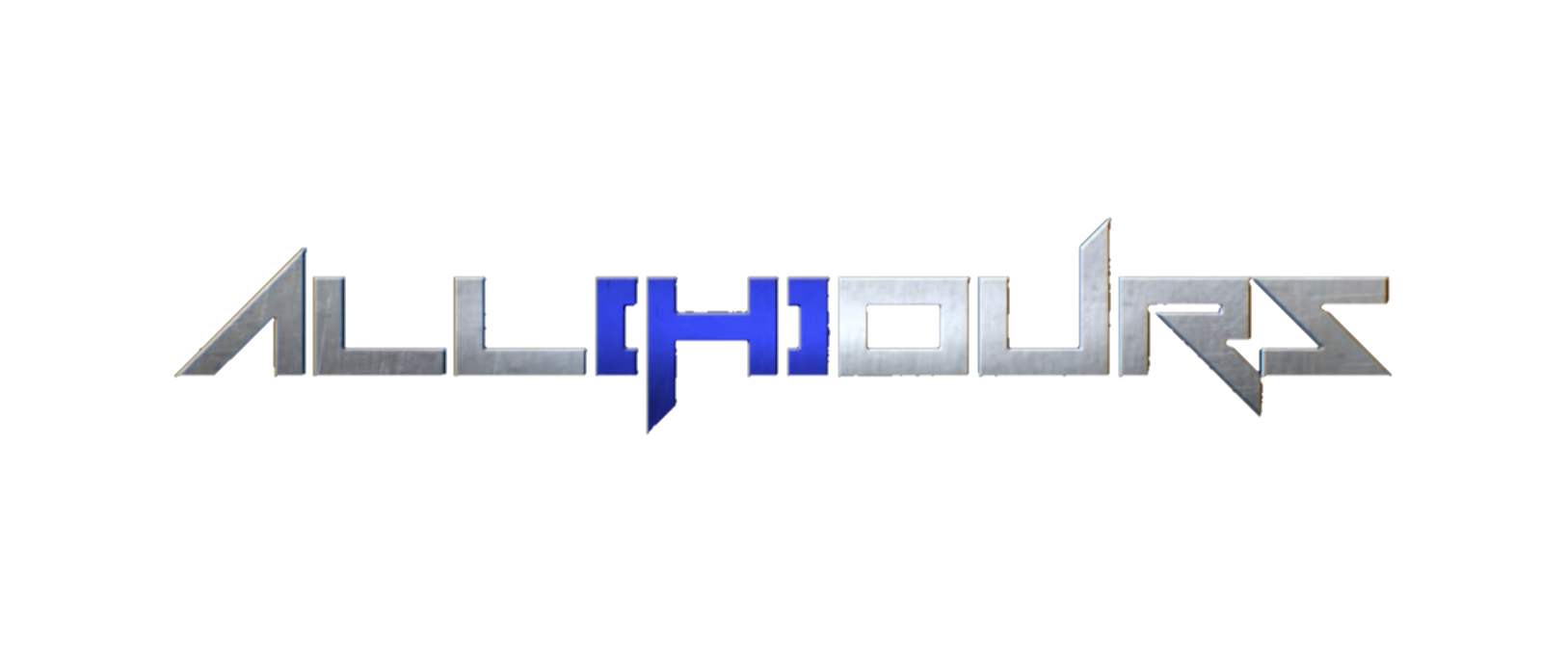
All(H)Ours official logo.

The group's name is a word play on the phrases "all ours" symbolizing the group's dedication to giving everything they have and "all hours" signifying their commitment to putting their utmost effort into every moment, suggesting the group will pour everything it has at all times.

== History ==
=== 2023: Introduction ===
On November 24, Eden Entertainment announced that they planned to launch their first boy group, All(H)Ours, in early 2024. On November 28, the seven members of the group were unveiled through their social media accounts, and each member were introduced starting from November 28 to December 4.

On December 16, All(H)Ours held a special event titled "Hello Ours!" with various activities in Hongdae for their fans before debuting. On December 19, the group announced that they would debut in January 2024, with the released of a video titled 'Preview of All(H)Ours' on their YouTube channel. Two days later, All(H)Ours confirmed that they would debut on January 10, 2024, with their first extended play All Ours.

=== 2024–present: Debut with All Ours and Witness ===
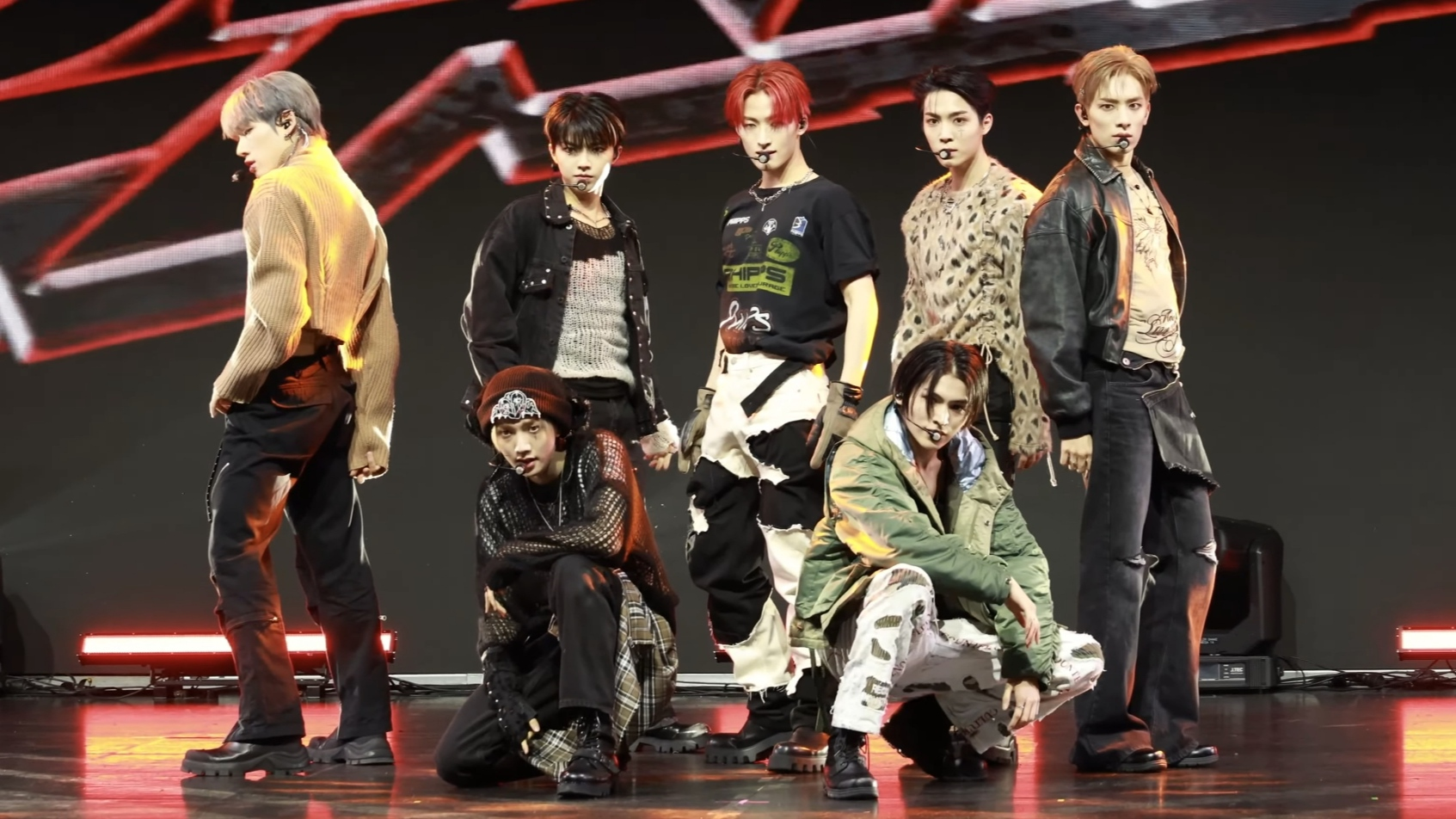
All(H)Ours performed their debut song "Gotcha" in January 2024.

On January 10, All(H)Ours made their debut with the release of their first EP All Ours alongside the single "Gotcha" and its music video. On the same day, the group held both media showcase in the afternoon and fan showcase called "It's All Ours" in the evening to commemorate their debut at Yes24 Live Hall in Gwangjin District, Seoul.

On June 10, All(H)Ours released a schedule poster for their second EP Witness to be released on July 2.

== Artistry ==
Eden Entertainment gave All(H)Ours their self-proclaimed nickname as "Stray Kids' cousin group" and Park Jin-young dubbed them as his "nephew group". All(H)Ours cited Stray Kids, Seventeen, and Jungkook as their role models. As the first Korean idol group to debut in 2024, the members expressed their ambition to leave a mark throughout the year.

== Members ==
- Kunho (건호) – leader, vocalist
- Youmin (유민) – vocalist, dancer
- Xayden (제이든) – rapper
- Minje (민제) – vocalist
- Masami (마사미) – rapper
- Hyunbin (현빈) – rapper
- On:N (온) – vocalist, dancer

== Discography ==
=== Extended plays ===
List of extended plays, showing selected details, chart positions and sales figures
Title	Details	Peak chart positions	Sales
Title	Details	KOR	Sales
All Ours	Released: January 10, 2024; Label: Eden Entertainment; Formats: CD, digital download, streaming; Track listing: 1. "Drift"; 2. "Gotcha" (으랏차차); 3. "Wao Wao"; 4. "Racer"; 5. "All Ours"	18	KOR: 31,757
Witness	Released: July 2, 2024; Label: Eden Entertainment; Formats: CD, digital download, streaming; Track listing: 1. "Witness"; 2. "Shock" (도깨비); 3. "Psycho Mantra"; 4. "'Bout That Issue"; 5. "Blah Blah"	9	KOR: 59,784
Smoke Point	Released: February 4, 2025; Label: Eden Entertainment; Formats: CD, digital download, streaming; Track listing: 1. "Smoke Point"; 2. "Graffiti"; 3. "Gimme Gimme"; 4. "Kings & Queens"; 5. "Freaky Fresh"	5	KOR: 86,202
VCF	Released: September 9, 2025; Label: Eden Entertainment; Formats: CD, digital download, streaming; Track listing: 1. "VCF"; 2. "Ready 2 Rumble"; 3. "Do It"; 4. "Good Job" (by Kunho, Xayden, Masami and Hyunbin); 5. "La Vida Loca" (by Youmin, Minje, On:n and Kunho)	7	KOR: 81,491
No Doubt	Released: March 16, 2026; Label: Eden Entertainment; Formats: CD, digital download, streaming; Track listing: 1. "No Doubt"; 2. "Dead Man Walking"; 3. "Piece of Me"; 4. "7 O'Clock"; 5. "Because I'm Crazy" (미쳤으니까); 6. "My Spring, My Light, My Breath" (나의 봄, 나의 빛, 나의 숨)	4	KOR: 74,882
Unbound	Released: September 10, 2026; Label: Eden Entertainment; Formats: CD, digital download, streaming; Track listing: 1. "Hop"; 2. "Dang Dang"; 3. "Only Me"; 4. "S!ren"	10	KOR: 35,220

=== Singles ===
List of singles, showing year released, selected chart positions and album name
Title	Year	Peak chart positions	Album
Title	Year	KOR DL	Album
"Gotcha" (으랏차차)	2024	159	All Ours
"Shock" (도깨비)	2024	162	Witness
"Graffiti"	2025	151	Smoke Point
"Gimme Gimme"	2025	101	Smoke Point
"Ready 2 Rumble"	2025	183	VCF
"White Christmas"	2025	—	Non-album single
"My Spring, My Light, My Breath" (나의 봄, 나의 빛, 나의 숨)	2026	—	No Doubt
"Dead Man Walking"	2026	145	No Doubt
"Hop"	2026	—	Unbound
"Dang Dang"	2026	—	Unbound
"—" denotes a recording that did not chart or was not released in that territory.

== Awards and nominations ==
Name of the award ceremony, year presented, award category, nominee(s) and the result of the award
Award ceremony	Year	Category	Nominee/work	Result	Ref.
MAMA Awards	2024	Artist of the Year	All(H)Ours	Nominated	
MAMA Awards	2024	Best New Male Artist	All(H)Ours	Nominated	
