= 2 ((G)I-dle album) =

2
- Digital cover

Studio album by (G)I-dle
- Released: January 29, 2024
- Length: 20:57
- Languages: Korean; English
- Labels: Cube; Kakao
- Producer: Soyeon

(G)I-dle chronology
Heat (2023)	2 (2024)	I Sway (2024)

Singles from 2
- 1. "Wife" Released: January 22, 2024; 2. "Super Lady" Released: January 29, 2024

2 is the second studio album by South Korean girl group (G)I-dle. It was released by Cube Entertainment on January 29, 2024, and contains eight tracks, including the pre-release single "Wife", and the lead single "Super Lady". The album was later supported by B-side songs such as "Fate" and "Revenge," which were successful on South Korean streaming platforms. The album aims to showcase the group's extensive involvement in writing and producing songs centered around themes of female empowerment, trusting one's instincts, destiny, and love.

== Background and release ==
On January 8, 2024, Cube Entertainment announced (G)I-dle would be releasing their second studio album titled 2 on January 29. Four days later, a comeback trailer was released. On January 13, the promotional schedule was released. Five days later, the track listing was released with "Super Lady" announced as the lead single. On January 19, the audio snippet teaser was released. On January 21, the music video teaser for "Wife" was released. A day later, "Wife" was released alongside its music video. On January 24, a story film for "Super Lady" was released, followed by the music video teasers on January 25 and 26. The music video was released on January 29. A music video for the b-side track "Revenge" was released on February 16.

== Conception and recording ==
"I didn't want to be stuck in a rut, so I named the album '2'—a special number with significance for us [(G)I-dle]. When flipped, it becomes 5, representing our five members, and coincidentally, it mirrors our debut date on May 2nd. Additionally, I wanted to create a regular album because of the abundance of songs we had. It wasn't a difficult decision, as regular albums tend to showcase a more diverse side of our music."

— Soyeon explained the name and concept of the album during an interview with "Noon Hope Song," via Sports Chosun.

In an interview with Billboard, the group discussed their creative process. Minnie shared, "I started working on our songs when we were heading towards the end of our world tour (I Am Free-ty World Tour). Although I did not have enough time, I worked on the songs non-stop and was able to make 'Vision' and '7Days' within 10 days." Shuhua added, "Whenever we had a free moment, we practiced and recorded our songs." As noted by Billboard, "all members took active roles in shaping the album's direction," with Soyeon emphasized the collaborative effort, saying, "We all were involved together. We communicated with the choreographer to revise the details while learning the choreography for our title track single 'Super Lady' because I wanted to do something that wasn't so obvious." Yuqi added, "Most of the choreography and concept were centered around Soyeon, as she is the producer of the group, but all of our members gathered together to share our opinions."

== Composition ==
2 contains eight tracks. The third track "Doll" was described as a song with "dark atmosphere" with lyrics "providing a fresh shock [in contrast] to the title reminiscent of a cute doll". In her review, Gladys Yeo of NME observed that "Doll" carries the essence of a sequel to 2022's "Sculpture," from their EP I Love (2022), portraying a shift into a villainous arc where the characters are no longer willing to contort themselves to gain love's validation. The fourth track "Vision" is a alluring jersey club song, with "dreamy chords." The fifth track "7 Days" contains "emotional guitar riff". The sixth track "Fate" was described as a song with "colorful band rhythm and melody". The seventh track "Rollie" was described as a hip-hop song with "dynamic and vintage" rhythm. The last track "Wife" was described as bubblegum bass-based pop song with "bold" lyrics that "attracts attention with metaphorical but explicit".

== Critical reception ==
Professional ratings
Review scores
Source	Rating
NME	4/5 stars
IZM	2/5 stars

Gladys Yeo of NME emphasized the versatility displayed in 2, noting a spectrum of tracks from energetic anthems to introspective love songs. She commended the album for its diversity and the group's evolving dynamics. However, Yeo criticized certain tracks for their lack of innovation. Overall, she highlighted how the album stands as a testament to (G)I-DLE's individuality both as performers and producers. IZM's Jang Jun-hwan reflects on (G)I-DLE's album I Never Die, which revitalizes the group's image as resilient and unyielding. He discusses the strategic approach of the pre-release single 'Wife', praising its boldness in breaking taboos within the K-pop scene. However, Jun-hwan criticizes the track 'Super lady' for losing its purpose and succumbing to overproduction. He evaluates other tracks like 'Revenge' and 'Doll', noting their thematic consistency but lack of individual power compared to previous b-side songs. Jun-hwan highlights 'Fate' as a standout track for its lyricism and atmospheric qualities. Ultimately, he questions the album's coherence and differentiation from the group's previous work, leaving lingering uncertainties about its intent and direction.

== Commercial performance ==
2 has surpassed the previous record set by I Feel; selling over 1,163,395 copies. Remarkably, the album achieved million-seller status within two days of its release, a notable feat given the recent downward trend in K-pop idol group sales. Positioning (G)I-DLE as the 5th highest-ranking K-pop girl group for all-time initial release sales, trailing behind Aespa, New Jeans, Ive, and Blackpink.

== Track listing ==
Track listing for 2
No.	Title	Lyrics	Music	Arrangement	Length
1.	"Super Lady"	Soyeon	Soyeon; Pop Time; Daily; Likey	Soyeon; Pop Time; Daily; Likey	2:32
2.	"Revenge"	Soyeon	Soyeon; Pop Time; Kako	Soyeon; Pop Time; Kako	2:24
3.	"Doll"	Yuqi; Boytoy; Jayins; Mojo	Yuqi; Boytoy; Mojo; Jayins; Lee Seung-hoon (Plz)	Lee Seung-hoon (Plz)	2:34
4.	"Vision"	Miyeon; Minnie; Roydo	Minnie; BreadBeat; Shin Kung	BreadBeat; Shin Kung	2:41
5.	"7Days"	Minnie; Tim Tan	Minnie; BreadBeat	BreadBeat	3:19
6.	"Fate" (나는 아픈 건 딱 질색이니까)	Soyeon	Soyeon; Pop Time; Daily; Likey	Soyeon; Pop Time; Daily; Likey	2:42
7.	"Rollie"	Yuqi; Boytoy; Melli (Plz); 213 (Plz); Mojo	Yuqi; Boytoy; Melli (Plz); 213 (Plz); Mojo; Milli Oshyun	213 (Plz); Mojo; Milli Oshyun; Boytoy	2:44
8.	"Wife"	Soyeon	Soyeon; Daily; Likey; Pop Time	Soyeon; Daily; Likey; Pop Time	2:01
Total length:					20:57

== Charts ==
=== Weekly charts ===
Weekly chart performance for 2
Chart (2024)	Peak position
Austrian Albums (Ö3 Austria)	59
Belgian Albums (Ultratop Flanders)	39
Croatian International Albums (HDU)	11
French Albums (SNEP)	62
German Albums (Offizielle Top 100)	22
Hungarian Physical Albums (MAHASZ)	8
Japanese Albums (Oricon)	19
Japanese Combined Albums (Oricon)	18
Japanese Hot Albums (Billboard Japan)	26
Nigerian Albums (TurnTable)	100
Portuguese Albums (AFP)	7
Scottish Albums (Official Charts)	23
South Korean Albums (Circle)	1
Swedish Physical Albums (Sverigetopplistan)	18
UK Album Downloads (Official Charts)	65
UK Albums Sales (OCC)	24
UK Independent Albums (Official Charts)	9
UK Physical Albums (OCC)	22
US Billboard 200	132
US Independent Albums (Billboard)	22
US World Albums (Billboard)	3

=== Monthly charts ===
Monthly chart performance for 2
Chart (2024)	Position
Japanese Albums (Oricon)	39
South Korean Albums (Circle)	1

=== Year-end charts ===
Year-end chart performance for 2
Chart (2024)	Position
South Korean Albums (Circle)	18

== Certifications ==
Certifications for 2
Region	Certification	Certified units/sales
South Korea (KMCA)	Million	1,000,000^{^}
^{^} Shipments figures based on certification alone.

== Release history ==
Release history for 2
Region	Date	Format	Label
Various	January 29, 2024	Digital download; streaming	Cube; Kakao
South Korea	January 30, 2024	CD	Cube; Kakao
