= Super Lady =

Single by (G)I-dle

from the album 2
- Language: Korean
- Released: January 29, 2024
- Genre: Electro house; ghetto house
- Length: 2:32
- Label: Cube; Kakao
- Songwriters: Soyeon; Pop Time; Daily; Likey
- Producer: Soyeon

(G)I-dle singles chronology
"Wife" (2024)	"Super Lady" (2024)	"Klaxon" (2024)

Music video
- "Super Lady" on YouTube

"Super Lady" is a song recorded by South Korean girl group (G)I-dle for their second studio album 2. It was released as the album's lead single by Cube Entertainment on January 29, 2024, in conjunction with the album. An electro house and G-House track driven by military drums, chants and "a strong bass", the song was written and produced by group member Soyeon with additional writing credits from Pop Time, Daily and Likey. Its lyrics discuss themes of female empowerment, confidence and strength.

"Super Lady" received mostly positive reviews from music critics who commend the group's musical growth and genre diversity. They also praised the production and the lead vocalist's range. However, some critics suggest that the intense lyrics sometimes overshadow the music. Commercially, the song saw moderate success, peaking within the top 10 in South Korea on the Circle Digital chart and Billboard Taiwan. It also reached the top 50 in Hong Kong, Japan, and Singapore.

The accompanying music video, co-directed by Soyeon and High Quality Fish, was uploaded onto the group's YouTube channel simultaneously with the single's release. Inspired by Beyoncé's style, the video showcases the group embodying powerful female personas ranging from Medusa to the Queen of Hearts. "Super Lady" received four first-place awards on South Korean music programs.

== Composition and lyrics ==
An electro-house and Ghetto house track, The Honey Pop noted that the song mixes "military drums, chants" and "a strong bass" with lyrics revolving around themes of female empowerment. The publication wrote that the song "also included fun easter eggs in their lyrics referencing other K-Pop girl groups' hits, conveying that it's about empowering all women and not about competing against each other." Cube Entertainment stated that "Super Lady" is a song "dedicated to every 'Super Lady' around the world and their beauty and strength within". In a Billboard interview, Soyeon expressed that she wanted to also deliver a message containing the confidence and strength of each member of (G)I-dle. She commented how Beyoncé is "a 'Super Lady' because she does everything perfectly, influencing other people who want to follow."

== Critical reception ==
Professional ratings
Review scores
Source	Rating
IZM	2/5 stars

In a review by IZM's Lim Dong-yeop, he praised (G)I-dle's transition from "Queencard" to "Super Lady" and their incorporation of various music styles like Latin and pop-punk. However, he noted that while the melody is simple, the intense message makes it hard to fully enjoy the music. The heavy lyrics overshadow the musical experience, detracting from the focus on the music itself. Reporter Cho Sung-jin from Hankooki lauded the song's overall production and Soyeon's vocal abilities as "impressive". He drew parallels between the song's scenes and iconic artists like Britney Spears, Beyoncé, and Lady Gaga, who dominated the late 90s to 2000s Billboard charts. Cho emphasized Soyeon's vocal range, especially her ability to hit a challenging "three-octave G". Despite primarily being a rapper in the group, Soyeon adeptly tackles demanding vocal sections, demonstrating her versatility. Additionally, Cho acknowledged Soyeon's role in (G)I-dle's success and her reputation for exceptional production skills. Ilgan Sports reporter Park Se-yeon, highlights Soyeon's empowering lyrics and the group's overall confidence, evident in their distinct vocal performances and the dynamic music video. She noted that the song underscores themes of empowerment and independence, reinforcing (G)I-dle's image as resilient performers.

== Music video ==
The music video scene features the group on stage in a stadium with flashing lights, reminiscent of 2NE1's 2011 song "I Am the Best."

The music video for "Super Lady" cost ₩1.1 billion (US$820,000) to produce, making it one of the most expensive music videos. It was co-directed by Soyeon along with High Quality Fish. It opens with the group members making an entrance on stage inside a stadium as lights flash around them. The visual has been likened to 2NE1's 2011 song "I Am the Best", with NME writing how (G)I-dle "channel the vibes" of 2NE1 in the music video "with larger-than-life styling and matching costumes." Throughout the video, each member takes on powerful female personas in their music video: Minnie as Medusa, Soyeon as Athena, Yuqi as Cruella, Miyeon as Cleopatra, and Shuhua as the Queen of Hearts. Ilgan Sports reporter Kim Jihyo observes that the video's grand scale, featuring numerous dancers and vibrant visuals, reflects the group's widespread fanbase. Kim also notes Jeon Soyeon's inspiration from Beyoncé, integrating elements from her music videos such as "Love on Top" and "Single Ladies."

== Accolades ==
On South Korean music programs, "Super Lady" won four first place awards.

Music program awards for "Super Lady"
Program	Date	Ref.
Show Champion	February 7, 2024	
M Countdown	February 8, 2024	
M Countdown	February 15, 2024	
M Countdown	February 22, 2024	

=== Listicles ===
Name of publisher, year listed, name of listicle, and placement
Publisher	Year	Listicle	Placement	Ref.
Billboard	2024	The 20 Best K-Pop Songs of 2024 (So Far): Critic's Picks	12th	

== Charts ==
=== Weekly charts ===
Weekly chart performance
Chart (2024)	Peak position
China Korean (TME)	10
Global 200 (Billboard)	114
Hong Kong (Billboard)	17
Japan (Japan Hot 100)	49
Japan Streaming (Oricon)	45
Singapore (RIAS)	23
South Korea (Circle)	10
Taiwan (Billboard)	2

=== Monthly charts ===
Monthly chart performance
Chart (2024)	Position
South Korea (Circle)	14

=== Year-end charts ===
Year-end chart performance
Chart (2024)	Position
South Korea (Circle)	85

== Release history ==
Release history
Region	Date	Format	Label
Various	January 29, 2024	Digital download; streaming	Cube; Kakao
