= Bam Yang Gang =

2024 single by Bibi

Single by Bibi

from the album Eve: Romance
- Language: Korean
- B-side: "Sugar Rush"
- Released: February 13, 2024
- Recorded: September 2023
- Length: 2:26
- Label: Feel Ghood
- Songwriter: Chang Ki-ha
- Producer: Chang Ki-ha

Bibi singles chronology
"Amigos" (2023)	"Bam Yang Gang" (2024)	"Feeling Lucky" (2024)

Music video
- "Bam Yang Gang" on YouTube

"Bam Yang Gang" (Korean: 밤양갱; lit. 'Korean chestnut yanggaeng') is a song by South Korean singer Bibi. It was produced by Chang Ki-ha and released on February 13, 2024, through Feel Ghood Music. The song immediately became a huge commercial success in South Korea, topping the Circle Digital Chart for several weeks and earning the artist a perfect all-kill. The song's title is the name of a Korean snack, which is a jelly made of chestnuts and red beans.

A music video for the song was released the same day. A week later on February 20, 2024, the music video for "Sugar Rush" which was written by Bibi and produced by Kyle Buckley was also released. "Sugar Rush" garnered attention for its explicit lyrics and return to her signature sound with playful lyrics comparing sweetness to candy and desserts with a warning to not get too close. It emphasized independence and self-sufficiency, rejecting unwanted advances and celebrating individuality.

== Background ==
Bibi said on the departure from her dark concepts and signature sound she became known for that she sang this song while remembering the sweet taste of bean jelly that her grandmother bought her when she was young. She sang the song with simple, repetitive melodies with a retro feel, so she doesn't burden anyone, regardless of gender or age. She sang the song while imagining what it would have been like if she were born 50 years ago and were a singer of that era. She worked on it, thinking about how that era would have interpreted the song.

Chang Ki-ha stated that he wrote the song years ago as an answer song to "Side by Side", a 2018 song by Kiha & The Faces.

== Composition ==
"Bam Yang Gang" is a "breezy song with a touch of waltz" written by singer-songwriter Chang Ki-ha. It depicts memories of past love. Through the lyrics, Bibi says that what she expected from her ex-boyfriend was not a grand feast but rather a traditional Korean treat "bamyanggaeng," or sweet chestnut red bean jelly, a metaphor for "simple yet authentic love".

== Reception ==
Park Su-jin of IZM rated the song 3.5 out of 5 stars. She wrote that the song "melts listeners' hearts from the start" by mixing waltz rhythm with marching snare drum sounds. In South Korea, the success of the song also increased sales of bamyanggaeng by 40% in confectionery stores. The song was heavily boosted by a singing challenge. Many people sang the song while eating the chestnut jelly while popular singers such as Lee Hyori attempted to sing the song with soft vocals similar to Bibi.

== Music videos ==
=== "Bam Yang Gang" ===
The music video stars Bibi as the protagonist and Chang as her ex-boyfriend. A fantasy-short that opens with the break-up scene, the woman is alone and sad in her home at night, but as soon as she falls asleep she’s visited by a witch also played by Bibi, who takes her into a magical realm, so that they can cook the bamyanggaeng together with the ubiquitous and friendly mice helping out. At the end she finally gets to eat the bamyanggaeng.

=== "Sugar Rush" ===
The Alice in Wonderland-inspired music video for "Sugar Rush" includes appearances by (G)I-dle's Soyeon and Choi Ye-na. Bibi is shown in a colorful dress dancing with two people dressed as grey wolves in a candy land. She is seen inside of a table filled with candies, Yena and Soyeon sit at it as she watches them devour the sweet goodies in front of her. As well as in bubbles that are similar to those popped from bubble gum. At the end she is seen in a simple look with red hair and a white top.

== Accolades ==
On South Korean music programs, "Bam Yang Gang" achieved first place win on the March 16 episode of Show! Music Core, and March 17 episode of Inkigayo. It was Bibi's first ever win on a music show.

Music program awards for "Bam Yang Gang"
Program	Date	Ref.
Show! Music Core	March 16, 2024	
Inkigayo	March 17, 2024	

=== Awards and nominations ===
Name of the award ceremony, year presented, category, and the result of the nomination
Ceremony	Year	Category	Result	Ref.
Korean Music Awards	2025	Best Pop Song	Won	
Korean Music Awards	2025	Song of the Year	Nominated	

=== Listicles ===
Name of publisher, year listed, name of listicle, and placement
Publisher	Year	Listicle	Placement	Ref.
Billboard	2024	The 20 Best K-Pop Songs of 2024 (So Far): Critic's Picks	10th	

== Charts ==
=== Weekly charts ===
Weekly chart performance for "Bam Yang Gang"
Chart (2024)	Peak position
Global 200 (Billboard)	79
South Korea (Circle)	1

=== Monthly charts ===
Monthly chart performance for "Bam Yang Gang"
Chart (2024)	Position
South Korea (Circle)	1

=== Year-end charts ===
Year-end chart performance for "Bam Yang Gang"
Chart (2024)	Position
South Korea (Circle)	12
