= I (Taeyeon song) =

2015 single by Taeyeon

Single by Taeyeon featuring Verbal Jint

from the EP I
- Released: October 7, 2015
- Studio: SM Blue Ocean (Seoul); MonoTree (Seoul)
- Genre: Pop rock
- Length: 3:26
- Label: SM Entertainment; KT Music
- Composers: Myah Marie Langston; Bennett Armstrong; Justin T. Armstrong; Cosmopolitan Douglas; David Quinones; Jon Asher; Ryan S. Jhun
- Lyricists: Taeyeon; Mafly; Verbal Jint

Taeyeon singles chronology
"Scars Deeper than Love" (2015)	"I" (2015)	"Rain" (2016)

Verbal Jint singles chronology
"My Type 2" (2015)	"I" (2015)	"If the World Is Perfect" (2015)

Music video
- "I" on YouTube

"I" is the debut solo single by South Korean singer Taeyeon featuring Verbal Jint. It was released by SM Entertainment on October 7, 2015, as the lead single from her debut EP of the same name. The song's instrumentation was developed from a track composed by a collaborative team of musicians, while Taeyeon and Verbal Jint wrote the Korean lyrics with assistance from Mafly. "I" is a mid-tempo pop rock song driven by an electric guitar and a drum beat, with autobiographical lyrics that reflect on Taeyeon's career and express hope for the future.

Commercially, the song peaked at number one on the weekly and monthly Gaon Digital Chart. By October 2018, it had sold over 2.5 million digital copies. The single earned 11 music program awards, as well as Song of the Month (October) at the Gaon Chart Music Awards and a Digital Bonsang at the 30th Golden Disc Awards. It received positive reviews from music critics in South Korea, who praised its musical styling, Taeyeon's vocal performance, and Verbal Jint's complementary rap verse.

The accompanying music video was filmed in Auckland, New Zealand. It illustrates Taeyeon's journey to find her identity and achieve freedom by depicting her in two contrasting roles: a café waitress and a woman wandering through a tranquil natural landscape. Taeyeon performed "I" on various South Korean music programs, including Inkigayo, M Countdown, Music Bank, and Show! Music Core. The song has since become a staple on the setlists of her concerts and tours.

== Background and release ==
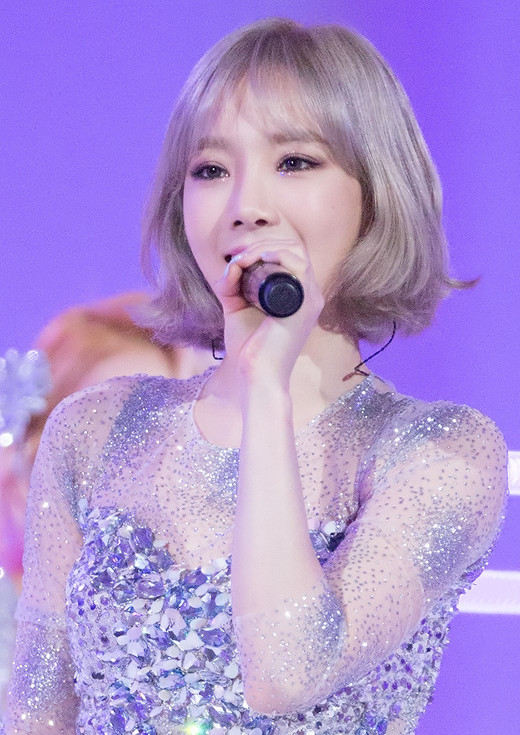
Taeyeon became the first member of Girls' Generation to debut as a solo artist with the single "I" and its accompanying EP.

Having earned recognition for her vocal ability through her work with Girls' Generation, its sub-unit TTS, and various collaborations and soundtracks, Taeyeon has been described by South Korean media as the "best idol vocalist", "OST queen", and "most emotive singer". On September 30, 2015, SM Entertainment announced her debut extended play (EP), I, for an October 7 release, making her the first Girls' Generation member to embark on a solo career. The agency confirmed that the title track, featuring South Korean musician Verbal Jint, would be released digitally alongside the rest of the EP's tracks.

According to the EP's liner notes, "I" was originated from an instrumental track titled "American Beauty", composed by Myah Marie Langston, Bennett Armstrong, Justin T. Armstrong, Cosmopolitan Douglas, David Quinones, Jon Asher, and Ryan S. Jhun. Taeyeon and Verbal Jint wrote the Korean lyrics alongside Mafly, while Taeyeon also provided her background vocals with Yang Geun-young. G-high, a core member from South Korean music production team MonoTree, was the vocal director and handling the recording, Pro Tools operation, and additional vocal editing at MonoTree studio; while Kim Cheol-sun recorded and mixed the track at SM Blue Ocean studio. The song was mastered by Tom Coyne at Sterling Sound, who also mastered for the whole EP.

In a V Live broadcast before the EP's launch, Taeyeon noted that "I" was the first song in her career for which she had requested extensive revisions and re-recordings. She stated that because she cherished the song deeply, she opted for numerous takes to achieve a "natural" vocal delivery rather than "machine-like" perfection. According to Verbal Jint, the collaboration occurred after SM contacted his agency, Brand New Music. He accepted the offer because Taeyeon was his favorite member of Girls' Generation, and he wanted to contribute to her first solo album. Despite their collaboration, the two artists never met in person during the song's production, and Verbal Jint mentioned he had been busy working on his own music. To mark her tenth anniversary, Taeyeon released a new "Solo Version" of "I" on her 2025 compilation album, Panorama: The Best of Taeyeon.

== Music and lyrics ==
Music critics categorized "I" as a pop rock song. On Music Y, Park Byung-woon observed that the track uses a power ballad chord progression in its second half to build a sense of epic scale. Structurally, it deviates from the standard idol music formula, following a progression of chorus–rap–chorus–verse–bridge–chorus. Kim Byung-woo suggested this structure alleviated pressure on Taeyeon while maximizing the focus on her vocal strengths. The track blends an electric guitar sound with a mid-tempo, heavy drum beat. The lyrics earned Taeyeon her first songwriting credit since her debut, recounting her emotions and experiences away from the spotlight while affirming her resolve for the future.

According to Seon Mi-kyung of OSEN, "I" marked a departure from Taeyeon's previous work with Girls' Generation and her soundtrack ballads and demonstrated her musical development. Her high notes in the chorus—"The sky pours light / And the child standing beneath it is I / Flying as if in a dream / My life is a beauty" (Note: Rough translation of 빛을 쏟는 sky / 그 아래 선 아이 I / 꿈꾸듯이 fly / My life is a beauty)—reaffirmed her status as a "tone gangster" (음색 깡패), a nickname given by the public to describe her distinct and emotive vocal timbre. During an appearance on You Hee-yeol's Sketchbook, Taeyeon explained that the repeated word "I" in the chorus symbolizes her desire to express herself more freely as she strives to overcome life's obstacles.

Following the opening chorus, Verbal Jint delivers a rap verse that guides Taeyeon toward her dreams, using metaphors of growth: "A story I've heard many times somewhere / The ugly duckling and the swan, or a butterfly before flight / People don't know, they can't see your wings / The world you've encountered might be cruel." (Note: Rough translation of 어디서 많이 들어본 이야기 / 미운 오리와 백조 또 날기 전의 나비 / 사람들은 몰라 너의 날개를 못 봐 / 네가 날개를 못 봐 네가 만난 세계라는 건 잔인할지도 몰라) The rap is followed by the second chorus. In her verse, Taeyeon reflects on the lonely, difficult periods she endured and the emotional fluctuations she faced, expressing her determination to overcome despair and pursue her dreams.

In a review for Billboard, Jeff Benjamin noted the song's acoustic elements and drew comparisons to the material on American singer Taylor Swift's album Red (2012), particularly the track "State of Grace". He commented that despite the stylistic similarities, Swift might struggle to execute the powerful vocal performance that Taeyeon delivers. Benjamin praised Taeyeon's vocal control, citing her transition from subdued verses to high notes in the final chorus.

== Critical reception ==
"I" received positive reviews from South Korean music critics and journalists, who praised the song's musicality, Taeyeon's artistic reinvention, her vocals, and the harmony between her performance and Verbal Jint's rap verse. (Note: Sourced from Music Y, OSEN, Newsway, Newsen, My Daily, Star News, and Sports Chosun.) Seon Mi-kyung of OSEN observed that with "I", Taeyeon successfully introduced a novel musical color, distinctly different from the "Taeyeon style" she had previously showcased. Yoon Hyo-jung of Newsen described the song as a flawless work in which Taeyeon's vocals blend beautifully with the track's dreamy atmosphere.

Hwang Seon-eop of IZM found the single refreshing, noting that Taeyeon took a risk by shedding her image as a balladeer and soundtrack specialist to venture into a rock-leaning style. Instead of dominating the track, she allowed the opening guitar riffs and rap verse to take precedence, balancing the instrumentation with her powerful, rhythmic vocals. Hwang also commended the authenticity of the autobiographical lyrics, viewing the release as a successful step in cementing her status as a solo artist rather than a conventional idol singer. On Music Y, Kim Sung-hwan remarked that while this style of pop-rock mixed with electronic elements is an international trend, placing Taeyeon's vocals against such a "wall of sound" was an "excellent choice" that propelled her musical maturity.

Kim Jung-won praised Taeyeon's clear diction and harmony with the instrumentation, which stabilized the track, and commented that Verbal Jint's rap further solidified her persona. Structurally, Kim Byung-woo noted that the song's free-form arrangement allowed Taeyeon to focus on her strengths. He added that the keyboard elements were intentionally understated so listeners could enjoy the track without being constrained by genre boundaries. Jung Byung-wook observed that the combination of a moderately dramatic tempo, bright guitar sounds, and relatable lyrics gave the song the charming appeal of a coming-of-age "teen comic". In a less positive review, Park Byung-woon criticized Verbal Jint's guest appearance, describing it as "throwing cold water on the immersion of the intro" and an unfortunate element compared to the cohesiveness of another album track, "U R".

== Music video ==
Before the video's release, Taeyeon shared a teaser photo on October 1, 2015, depicting her dressed as a farm girl with blonde hair and a long beige cardigan, standing among sheep in a New Zealand field. On October 2, SM released a series of photos and revealed that the music video was filmed entirely in Auckland, New Zealand. Later that afternoon, Taeyeon posted a short behind-the-scenes video on SM Everyshot. SM released previews and teasers on October 3 and 5. The video premiered at 12:00 KST on October 7, 2015.

The video includes a cameo by Taeyeon's older brother, and Verbal Jint appears in a separate scene. On Sunny's FM Date, Verbal Jint explained that although he wanted to travel to New Zealand to film with Taeyeon, he was unable to do so and had to shoot his scene separately at an indoor studio in Samseong-dong, Gangnam-gu. The café scenes were filmed at The Portland Public House in Kingsland. Taeyeon plays a dual role: a disillusioned waitress at a café and a traveler exploring the New Zealand wilderness. After seeing a butterfly, Taeyeon takes her boss's car keys, leaves her job, and drives along the coast. The video concludes as the two versions of Taeyeon meet, suggesting her success in finding freedom and true identity. South Korean publications praised the video's scenic New Zealand backdrops and wrote that Taeyeon's styling complemented the song's theme. (Note: Sourced from Newsway, Star News, Xports News, Digital Times, and OSEN.)

== Live performances ==
Taeyeon performed "I" for the first time on Mnet's M Countdown on October 8, 2015, with the rap verse delivered by Kanto. The following day, they performed the song on KBS2's Music Bank and returned to M Countdown on October 15. Taeyeon and Kanto also appeared on MBC's Show! Music Core and SBS's Inkigayo on October 17 and 18, respectively. During her seven-day sold-out solo concert series, Very Special Day, Taeyeon performed "I" alongside other tracks from her debut EP. While singing the song on the reality television show Daily Taeng9Cam on November 14, 2015, Taeyeon was surprised when Verbal Jint made his first appearance to perform the rap verse alongside her.

Taeyeon performed "I" solo at the 2015 Mnet Asian Music Awards and the 30th Golden Disc Awards. She also performed the track at the year-end KBS Song Festival in 2015 and on You Hee-yeol's Sketchbook on February 19, 2016. Verbal Jint appeared at the SayPop Concert on April 1, 2016, where he performed his rap verse from "I" along with several of his own songs. Taeyeon included "I" in her setlists for the Butterfly Kiss concerts (2016) and her Japan Showcase Tour (2018). The song has also been a staple of all her headlining Asian tours: Persona (2017), 's... (2018–2019), ~Signal~ (2019), The Unseen (2020), The Odd of Love (2023), and The Tense (2025).

== Commercial performance and accolades ==
Within seven hours of its release, "I" achieved a "real-time all-kill" across eight major South Korean music streaming platforms: Melon, Genie, Mnet, Olleh Music, Soribada, Naver, Bugs!, and Monkey3. The song debuted at number one on the Gaon Digital Chart for the 43rd week of 2015, and topped the monthly Gaon Digital Chart for October 2015. By October 2018, "I" had sold 2.5 million digital copies in South Korea according to Gaon Chart statistics. In the United States, the track had sold 15,000 digital copies according to MRC Data by May 2020.

The commercial success of "I" and other cross-agency collaborations in late 2015 marked a shift in SM Entertainment's strategy. Beginning in 2016, through the SM Station project, the agency became significantly more open to collaborating with external artists, producers, and brands. This was a departure from its traditional approach, which had primarily focused on developing in-house talent and resources. Billboard and Dazed ranked "I" at number 2 and number 15, respectively, on their lists of the 20 best K-pop songs of 2015. At the end of the decade, Billboard placed the song at number 58 on its list of the 100 Greatest K-Pop Songs of the 2010s. Melon ranked "I" at number 79 on its list of the Top 100 K-pop Songs of All Time.

"I" received two nominations at the 2015 Mnet Asian Music Awards for Best Vocal Performance – Female and Song of the Year. The song won Best Collaboration at the 2015 Soompi Awards for Taeyeon and Verbal Jint. For the song's commercial performance, Taeyeon won Artist of the Year – Digital Music (October) at the 5th Gaon Chart Music Awards. "I" also received a Digital Bonsang and was nominated for the Digital Daesang at the 30th Golden Disc Awards. It earned 11 first-place trophies on South Korean weekly music programs, with its final win on Inkigayo on November 22, 2015.

List of awards and nominations
Year	Ceremony	Category	Result	Ref.
2015	2015 Mnet Asian Music Awards	Best Vocal Performance – Female	Nominated	
2015	2015 Mnet Asian Music Awards	Song of the Year	Nominated	
2015	Soompi Awards	Best Collaboration	Won	
2015	5th Gaon Chart Music Awards	Artist of the Year (Digital Music) – October	Won	
2016	30th Golden Disc Awards	Digital Daesang	Nominated	
2016	30th Golden Disc Awards	Digital Bonsang	Won	

List of music program awards
Program	Date	Ref.
Show Champion	October 14, 2015	
M Countdown	October 15, 2015	
M Countdown	October 22, 2015	
M Countdown	October 29, 2015	
Music Bank	October 16, 2015	
Music Bank	October 23, 2015	
Music Bank	October 30, 2015	
Show! Music Core	October 24, 2015	
Inkigayo	October 18, 2015	
Inkigayo	October 25, 2015	
Inkigayo	November 22, 2015	

== Credits and personnel ==
Credits are adapted from the liner notes of I.

=== Locations ===
- SM Blue Ocean Studio (Seoul) – recording, mixing
- MonoTree Studio (Seoul) – recording, additional vocal editing
- Sterling Sound (Edgewater, New Jersey) – mastering

=== Personnel ===
- Korean lyrics – Taeyeon, Mafly, Verbal Jint
- Rap lyrics – Verbal Jint
- Vocal directing – G-high
- Background vocals – Taeyeon, Yang Geun-young
- Recording – Kim Cheol-sun at SM Blue Ocean, G-high (under his birth name Yoo Ji-sang) at MonoTree
- Pro Tools operating – G-high
- Additional vocal editing – G-high at MonoTree
- Mixing – Kim Cheol-sun at SM Blue Ocean
- Mastering – Tom Coyne at Sterling Sound

=== Original track credits ===
- Original title – "American Beauty"
- Original writers – Myah Marie Langston, Bennett Armstrong, Justin T. Armstrong, Cosmopolitan Douglas, David Quinones, Jon Asher, Ryan S. Jhun

== Charts ==
=== Weekly charts ===
Chart (2015)	Peak position
South Korea (Gaon)	1

=== Monthly charts ===
Chart (2015)	Peak position
South Korea (Gaon)	1

=== Year-end charts ===
Chart (2015)	Position
South Korea (Gaon)	39

Chart (2016)	Position
South Korea (Gaon)	99
