= Heartbreak on Vinyl =

Studio album by Blake Lewis
- Released: October 6, 2009
- Genres: Electropop; dance-pop
- Length: 51:42
- Label: Tommy Boy Records
- Producers: Dave Audé; James "Bird" Baker; Jean Baptiste; Ryan Buendia; Darkchild; Devil's Gun; Oliver Goodman; Free School; The JAM; Jukebox; Laze & Royal; Oligee; Jørgen Olsen; Jesse Rogg; Carl Ryden; S*A*M and Sluggo; Ryan Tedder; Alain Whyte; Peter Zizzo

Blake Lewis chronology
| A.D.D. (Audio Day Dream) (2007) | Heartbreak on Vinyl (2009) | Portrait of a Chameleon (2014) |

Singles from Heartbreak on Vinyl
- 1. "Sad Song" Released: July 21, 2009; 2. "Heartbreak on Vinyl" Released: January 19, 2010

Heartbreak on Vinyl is the second studio album by American singer-songwriter Blake Lewis released on October 6, 2009, by Tommy Boy Records. A double LP pressed on red vinyl with only 500 copies was released on August 13, 2010. The vinyl contained instant access to the Heartbreak on Vinyl digital album, 13 remixes of the hit single "Heartbreak on Vinyl" and an unreleased remix of "'Till We See the Sun." Although "Heartbreak on Vinyl" became Lewis' most successful single, the album only sold 10,000 copies; less than 1/30 of the copies of his debut A.D.D. (Audio Day Dream).

== Critical reception ==
Professional ratings
Review scores
| Source | Rating |
|---|---|
| Allmusic | 3.5/5 stars |

Stephen Thomas Erlewine from AllMusic said "he's brought all his disparate interests together on Heartbreak on Vinyl, which cut for cut is more rhythmic and melodic than A.D.D. and as a whole lot more memorable. Lewis doesn't separate his club rhythms and Morrissey obsessions, winding up with a record that sounds curiously and unwittingly like a soundtrack to a Eurotrash club, but in an appealing fashion because it feels uncontrived and often very catchy."

Max Specht from Pressplus1 said "This album is a melting pot of styles that really sums up the kind of artist Blake Lewis is, he’s all over the place yet centered all at once. He’s an homage as much as he is a trailblazer in pop music, and this album will help find him fans with commuters blasting the radio, to night owls dancing the night away in crowded clubs down main street."

== Track listing ==
Heartbreak on Vinyl

| No. | Title | Writer(s) | Producer(s) | Length |
|---|---|---|---|---|
| 1. | "Heartbreak on Vinyl" | Blake Lewis; Sam Hollander; Dave Katz; Ben Levels | S*A*M and Sluggo | 3:59 |
| 2. | "Binary Love" | Lewis; Steven McMorran; Qura Rankin; Carl Ryden | Ryden | 3:28 |
| 3. | "Freak" | Lewis; Lauren Christy; Jesse Rogg | Rogg | 4:30 |
| 4. | "Sad Song" | Lewis; Hollander; Katz | S*A*M and Sluggo | 4:31 |
| 5. | "Rhythm of My Heart" | Lewis; Drew Ryan Scott; Justyn Armstrong; Bennett Armstrong | Laze & Royal | 3:41 |
| 6. | "Afraid" | Jordan Omley; Michael Mani; Ronald Jackson | Darkchild; The JAM; Jukebox | 3:34 |
| 7. | "Left My Baby for You" | Lewis; Jean Baptiste; Ryan Buendia; Nick Marsh; Michael McHenry; Whyte | Free School | 5:03 |
| 8. | "Rebel Without a Cause" | Lewis; Eve Nelson; Stephen Wrabel | Oliver Goodman; James "Bird" Baker | 3:53 |
| 9. | "SuperScratchaVocalisticTurnatableLicious" | | | 1:05 |
| 10. | "Our Rapture of Love" | Lewis; Jørgen Olson | Olsen | 4:46 |
| 11. | "The Point" | Lewis; Peter Zizzo | Zizzo | 3:54 |
| 12. | "The Remedy" | Lewis; Dave Audé; Oliver Goldstein; Steven McMorran | Oligee; Audé | 4:41 |
| 13. | "Love or Torture (Please Don't Stop)" | Lewis; Ryan Tedder | Audé; Tedder | 4:58 |
| 14. | "Till' We See the Sun" (3rd single off album *only on Limited Double LP Edition*) | Lewis | Devil's Gun | 4:41 |
| Total length: | | | | 51:42 |

== Chart performance ==
The album debuted at number 135 on the Billboard Top 200, selling 4,000 albums in its first week.

| Chart (2009–2010) | Peak position |
|---|---|
| U.S. Billboard 200 | 135 |
| U.S. Dance/Electronic Albums | 7 |
| U.S. Independent Albums | 20 |

== Singles ==
- "Sad Song" was released as the lead single from the album on July 21, 2009. The music video was filmed in late August 2009 and released on September 21, 2009.
- "Heartbreak on Vinyl" was released as the second single from the album on January 19, 2010. It has since become his first Number One hit on the U.S. Billboard Hot Dance Club Play chart for the week of April 24, 2010. The single also reached number one on Billboard's Hot Dance Airplay chart in its May 22, 2010, issue, another first for Lewis. It is to date his most successful single.
- "Till' We See the Sun (Remix)" With the announcement of his special edition of his album, Lewis announced this bonus track would be the third single from the album and would a radio only single. The original version of this song was released in mid-2012.

== Personnel ==
Credits adapted from AllMusic.

Vocals

- Blake Lewis – primary artist, vocals
- Steve McMorran – vocals
- Eve Nelson – vocals
- Peter Zizzo – background vocals
- Carl Ryden – vocals

Musicians

- Joe Doria – keyboards
- Dave Katz – keyboards
- Ben Levels – keyboards
- Blake Lewis – turntables
- Mark Maxwell – synthesizer
- Eve Nelson – piano
- KJ Sawka – drums
- Carl Ryden – drums, keyboards

Production

- Dave Audé – producer
- James "Bird" Baker – producer
- Jean Baptiste – producer
- Jim Bottari – engineer, mixing
- Ryan Buendia – producer
- Devil's Gun — producer
- Free School – producer
- Sean Gould – engineer
- Rodney "Darkchild" Jerkins – producer
- The JAM – producer
- Jukebox – producer
- Blake Lewis – engineer, mixing
- Tony Mardini – mixing

- Mark Maxwell – engineer, producer, programming
- Oligee – producer
- Jørgen Olsen – producer
- Jesse Rogg – producer
- Carl Ryden – engineer, mixing, programming
- S*A*M and Sluggo – producer
- Miriam Santos – photography
- KJ Sawka – engineer, mixing programming
- David Shackney – mixing
- Ryan Tedder – producer
- Alain Whyte – producer
- Peter Zizzo – arranger, engineer, programming

== Release history ==
| Country | Date | Other |
|---|---|---|
| United States | October 6, 2009 | Standard version |
| United States | August 13, 2010 | Special edition |
| Canada | October 13, 2009 | Standard version |
| Canada | August 13, 2010 | Special edition |
