= Blake Lewis (EP) =

EP by Blake Lewis
- Released: May 22, 2007
- Recorded: 2007
- Genre: Pop rock
- Length: 14:21
- Label: 19 Entertainment; Fox Interactive Media

Blake Lewis chronology
Blake Lewis (2007)	A.D.D. (Audio Day Dream) (2007)

Blake Lewis is an EP by Blake Lewis, the runner-up on the sixth season of American Idol. It was released digitally on May 22, 2007.

== Background ==
The EP is compiled of five studio versions of songs covered by Lewis from the American Idol official website. It features the Billboard Hot 100 hit, "You Give Love a Bad Name" which is originally by Bon Jovi, but heavily rearranged by Lewis during the Idol series.

The songs on the EP are from Lewis's performances throughout the Idol series. Each week, Lewis would perform a song on Idol and the day after he performed it, it would be put up on the American Idol official website for sale as a studio version. Lewis covered and amassed more songs by various established artists as he progressed to the Idol finale.

== Release and chart performance ==
This EP is on iTunes Store for downloading and was also available as a "bundle" on the American Idol official website until June 20, 2007. The songs that did not make the EP's cut are also available for download as individual singles from both iTunes Store and the Idol official website.

The EP peaked at number three on the Billboard Top Digital Albums chart, having sold 46,000 units as of January 10, 2008.

== Track listing ==
1. "You Give Love a Bad Name" 3:08
2. "Time of the Season" 2:48
3. "I Need to Know" 2:29
4. "Lovesong" 3:27
5. "When the Stars Go Blue" 2:29
