= Panorama: The Best of Taeyeon =

- Digital cover

Compilation album by Taeyeon
- Released: December 1, 2025
- Length: 82:45
- Language: Korean
- Labels: SM; Kakao

Taeyeon chronology
Letter to Myself (2024)	Panorama: The Best of Taeyeon (2025)	Unspecial (2026)

Singles from Panorama: The Best of Taeyeon
- 1. "Panorama" Released: December 1, 2025

Panorama: The Best of Taeyeon is the first compilation album by South Korean singer Taeyeon. It was released by SM Entertainment on December 1, 2025, and contains 24 tracks, including the new lead single "Panorama" alongside a selection of previously released songs. The album commemorates the tenth anniversary of her solo career.

== Background and release ==
On November 17, 2025, SM Entertainment announced that Taeyeon would release her first compilation album titled Panorama: The Best of Taeyeon with the lead single "Panorama" to commemorate the tenth anniversary of her solo career on December 1. A prologue teaser video was released the same day. The following day, the promotional schedule was released through a short film. Teaser images and videos for the album were released from November 19 to 21. The music video teaser for "Panorama" was released on November 28, followed by teaser images for the lead single on November 29 and 30. The album was released alongside the music video for "Panorama" on December 1.

== Composition ==
Panorama: The Best of Taeyeon contains 24 tracks. The lead single, "Panorama", is a pop rock song featuring "a blend of piano, synthesizer, drum, and guitar rhythm" with lyrics that "convey a greeting for the past and the days to come".

== Promotion ==
An exhibition named "Time Lapse, Timeless" was opened in Seoul, South Korea, running from November 26 to December 3.

== Track listing ==
Panorama: Disc 1 track listing
No.	Title	Lyrics	Music	Arrangement	Length
1.	"Panorama" (인사; Insa; 'Greeting')	Mola	Mary Josephine Young; Keith Varon; JT Foley; Alida Garpestad Peck	Keith Varon	3:00
2.	"Letter to Myself"	Ha Yoo-na (153/Joombas)	Dino Medanhodzic; Johanna Jansson; Rena Lovelis; Nia Lovelis; Casey Moreta	Dino Medanhodzic	3:04
3.	"Time Lapse" (2025 Mix)	Kim Jong-wan	Kim Jong-wan; Zooey	Kim Jong-wan; Zooey	4:16
4.	"Fine"	Jinli (Full8loom)	Michael Woods (Rice n' Peas); Kevin White (Rice n' Peas); Andrew Bazzi (Rice n' Peas); Shaylen Carroll; MZMC	Rice n' Peas	3:29
5.	"INVU"	Jinli (Full8loom)	Peter Wallevik; Daniel Davidsen; Rachel Furner; Jess Morgan	PhD	3:25
6.	"Spark" (불티; Bulti; 'Spark')	Kenzie	Kenzie; Anne Judith Wik; Ronny Svendsen	Kenzie; Anne Judith Wik; Ronny Svendsen	3:38
7.	"Set Myself on Fire"	Kenzie	Alna Hofmeyr; Michael Dunaief; Ryland Holland; Hamid Bashir	Stryv	2:38
8.	"Some Nights" (그런 밤; Geureon bam; 'A Night Like That')	Kim Eana	Edvard Grieg; Simon Petrén; Andreas Öberg	Simon Petrén	3:28
9.	"Make Me Love You"	Jo Yoon-kyung	Aaron Benward; Matthew Tishler; Felicia Barton	Aaron Benward; Matthew Tishler; Felicia Barton	3:33
10.	"I" (Solo ver.)	Taeyeon; Mafly; Verbal Jint	Myah Marie Langston; Bennett Armstrong; Justin T. Armstrong; Cosmopolitan Douglas; David "DQ" Quiñones; Jon Asher; Ryan S. Jhun	Myah Marie Langston; Bennett Armstrong; Justin T. Armstrong; Cosmopolitan Douglas; David "DQ" Quiñones; Jon Asher; Ryan S. Jhun	2:43
11.	"Why"	Jo Yoon-kyung	LDN Noise; Lauren Dyson; Rodnae "Chikk" Bell	LDN Noise; Lauren Dyson; Rodnae "Chikk" Bell	3:28
12.	"Weekend"	Hwang Yu-bin	RoseInPeace; Saimon; Willemijn van der Neut; Marcia "Misha" Sondeijker	RoseInPeace; Saimon	3:53

Panorama: Disc 2 track listing
No.	Title	Lyrics	Music	Arrangement	Length
13.	"To. X"	Kenzie	Stephen Puth; Dazy; Kristin Carpenter	Stephen Puth; Dazy	2:50
14.	"What Do I Call You"	Kenzie	Linnea Södahl; Caroline Pennell; David Pramik	David Pramik	2:48
15.	"Four Seasons" (사계; Sagye; 'The Four Seasons')	Kenzie	Josh Cumbee (Nonfiction); Afshin Salmani (Nonfiction); Andrew Allen; Kenzie	Nonfiction; Kenzie	3:08
16.	"All For Nothing"	Taeyeon; Hwang Yu-bin	Mike Robinson; Sarah Troy; Thomas Daniel	Mike Robinson	3:11
17.	"I'm All Ears" (겨울나무; Gyeoullamu; 'Winter Tree')	Lee Joo-hyung (MonoTree)	Lee Joo-hyung (MonoTree); Astrid Holiday	Lee Joo-hyung (MonoTree)	3:35
18.	"11:11"	Kim Eana	Christian Vinten; Chelcee Grimes	Christian Vinten; Chelcee Grimes	3:43
19.	"Rain"	Bong Eun-young; Mafly; Lee Yoo-jin	Matthew Tishler; Aaron Benward; Felicia Barton; Olivia Holt	Matthew Tishler	3:42
20.	"Gravity"	JQ (Makeumine Works); Moon Ye-rin (Makeumine Works)	Lance Shipp; Rachael Kennedy; Nathalia Marshall; Angel Lopez; Gilde Flores	Lionchild; Angel Lopez; Gilde Flores	4:00
21.	"Disaster"	Bay (153/Joombas); Ephy (153/Joombas)	Rob Resnick; Sarah de Warren; GiGi Grombacher	Rob Resnick; Sarah de Warren; GiGi Grombacher	3:13
22.	"U R"	Jo Yoon-kyung	Matthew Tishler; Robyn Newman; Ben Charles	Matthew Tishler; Robyn Newman; Ben Charles	4:34
23.	"Ending Credits"	Ji Ye-won (153/Joombas)	Mich Hansen; Jeppe London Bilsby; Celine Svanbäck; Sam Merrifield	Cutfather; Jeppe London Bilsby	3:45
Total length:					79:22

Panorama: CD only bonus track
No.	Title	Lyrics	Music	Arrangement	Length
24.	"Panorama" (Live Studio Session); (인사)	Mola	Mary Josephine Young; Keith Varon; JT Foley; Alida Garpestad Peck	Keith Varon	3:23
Total length:					82:45

== Charts ==
=== Weekly charts ===
Weekly chart performance for Panorama: The Best of Taeyeon
Chart (2025)	Peak position
Japanese Digital Albums (Oricon)	20
Japanese Download Albums (Billboard Japan)	16
South Korean Albums (Circle)	2

=== Monthly charts ===
Monthly chart performance for Panorama: The Best of Taeyeon
Chart (2025)	Position
South Korean Albums (Circle)	5

== Release history ==
Release history for Panorama: The Best of Taeyeon
Region	Date	Format	Label
South Korea	December 1, 2025	CD	SM; Kakao
Various	December 1, 2025	Digital download; streaming	SM; Kakao
South Korea	January 30, 2026	LP	SM; Kakao
