= Blake Lewis =

American musician (born 1981)

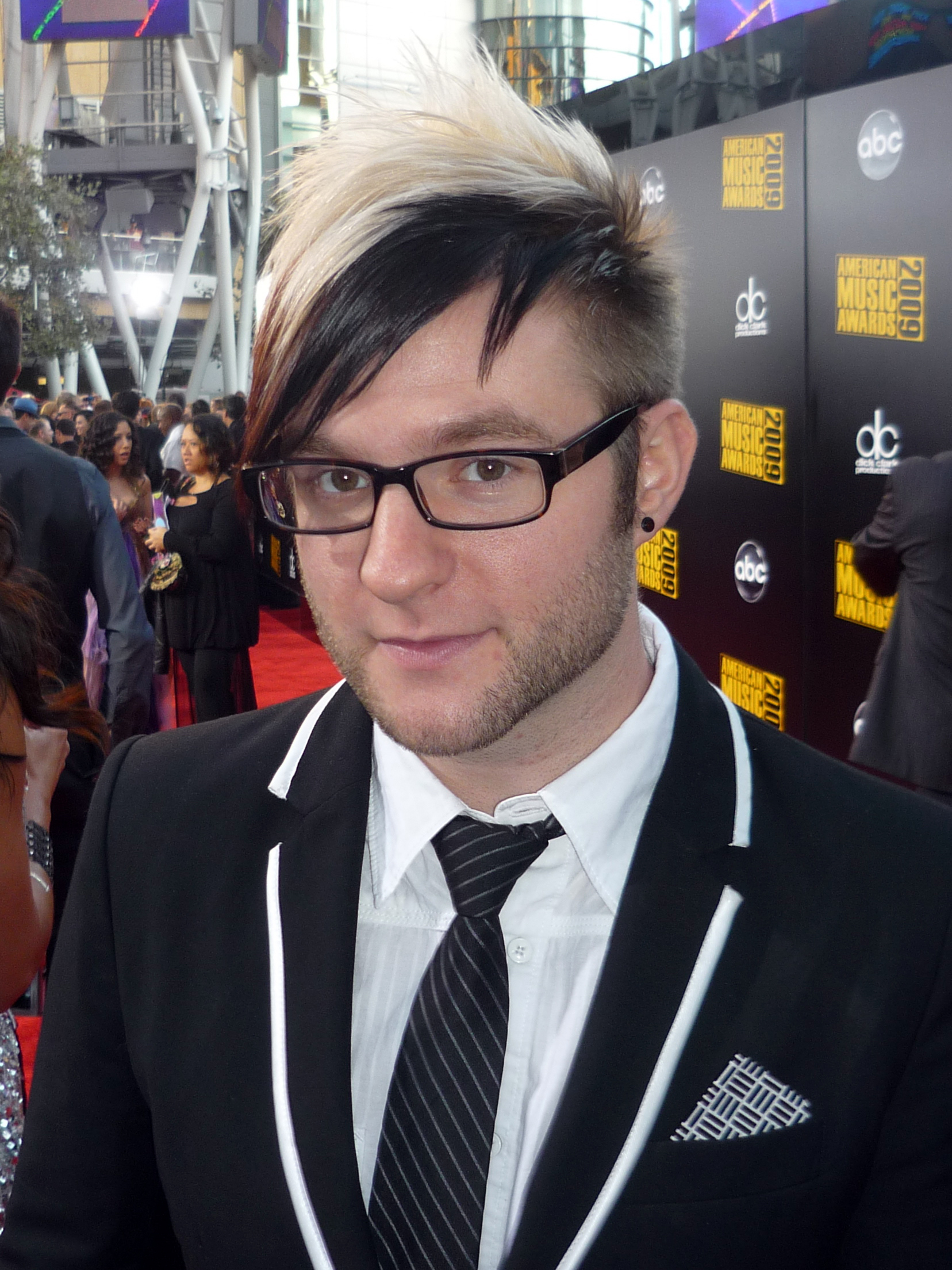
- Blake Lewis at the 2009 American Music Awards

Background information
- Also known as: BShorty
- Born: Blake Colin Lewis; July 21, 1981 (age 45); Redmond, Washington, U.S.
- Origin: Bothell, Washington, U.S.
- Genres: Pop; soul; electropop
- Occupations: Musician; singer; actor
- Instruments: Vocals; guitar; keyboard; drums; beatboxing; loop pedals
- Years active: 2007–present
- Labels: Arista; 19; Tommy Boy; Republic; Audio Day Dream Records
- Formerly of: Kickshaw
- Website: blakelewisofficial.com

Blake Colin Lewis (born July 21, 1981) is an American musician and actor who was the runner-up on the sixth season of American Idol. His major label debut album A.D.D. (Audio Day Dream) was released on December 4, 2007, through 19 Recordings and Arista Records. On October 30, 2007, his first single "Break Anotha" was released. The album landed on number ten on the U.S. Billboard 200 as its highest peak position with 97,500 copies sold in its debut, and has sold over 350,000 copies. After the release of his second single "How Many Words", which peaked at number eight on the U.S. Billboard Dance/Club Play Songs, Lewis was dropped by Arista Records. Lewis eventually signed with Tommy Boy Records.

His second album, Heartbreak on Vinyl, was released on October 6, 2009. The first single "Sad Song" was released on July 21, 2009. The album charted at number 135 on the U.S. Billboard Billboard 200, number twenty on the Billboard Independent Albums, and number seven on the Billboard Dance/Electronic Albums with over 4,000 copies sold in the first week.

His third album, Portrait of a Chameleon, was released on May 20, 2014. This was his first independent record and includes the single "Your Touch".

His fourth album, Wanderlust Unknown, was released in February 2020.

== Biography ==
=== Early years ===
Lewis was born in Redmond, Washington to Dallas and Dinah Lewis. Dinah is a former rocker who still sings and plays guitar. He is an only child and is of Welsh, Swiss, German and Irish descent. He attended Kenmore Junior High and later Inglemoor High School in Kenmore, Washington. In high school, Lewis participated in many high school state competitions . He also took part in numerous musicals, as well as comedy and rap videos with his friends. In many of these videos, he portrayed his alter ego, Jimmie Walker Blue, the character he introduced during the semi-final round of American Idol.

Lewis started beatboxing at seventeen. He picked up this talent purely by ear, listening to CDs of beatboxing, after he was inspired by Matthew Selby, a former member of the Los Angeles-based a cappella group M-Pact, of which fellow American Idol semi-finalist Rudy Cárdenas was a member. Aside from singing and beatboxing, Lewis plays the guitar, keyboard, drums and has written many songs such as "She Loves the Way", "Emotional Waterfalls", "Dumpty Humpty" and "Jealousy". He describes himself as an improv musician and often uses devices such as loop pedals and the Kaoss Pad to layer beatboxing, instruments, vocals and effects to create a song live on stage.

Being a member of the a cappella group Kickshaw for four years after graduating from high school in 1999, Lewis worked with the group on a 10-track album titled Put It in the Microphone, but he quit the group in 2002 to become a solo musician going by the stage name Bshorty, which was basically inspired by the nicknames of the members of 311 and "aggressive inline-skate videos during the 1990s", "doing drum and bass shows, and conscious hip hop shows, singer-songwriter stuff, and electronica and hip hop". He made connections with various musicians by performing regularly in many venues in Seattle such as Nectar Lounge in Fremont, SeaMonster Lounge, Lo-Fi Performance Gallery, Jet Deck in Everett (now in Mill Creek) and hosted shows like The Digital Lounge shows at ToST. Before Idol, he was working on a solo album with a number of tracks finished.

== American Idol ==
=== Overview ===
Though he initially found American Idol unappealing, Lewis auditioned for it in Seattle with "Crazy" by Seal and an off-screen rendition of "Sunday Morning" by Maroon 5. Introducing himself as the local beatboxing champion in the audition, Lewis beatboxed along with his teammates, including Chris Sligh, Rudy Cárdenas and Tom Lowe, to "How Deep Is Your Love" by Bee Gees in the Hollywood's Week. The memorable performance received a standing ovation from the audience and Paula Abdul, who commented "that brought down the house". In an early episode of the United Kingdom edition of American Idol, Lewis recalled his first solo performance in the Hollywood's Week was "Papa Was a Rollin' Stone" by The Temptations. When later he sang it in front of the other finalists, Phil Stacey felt that it was the best performance he has seen from Lewis.

Lewis ended up the last male contestant standing, despite Simon's first impression that the singer was a bit "over the top" adding "I don't know if you're as good as you think you are". But soon afterward, the judges began predicting Lewis' "front runner" status. In an exclusive interview with X17Online on March 4, 2007, Simon Cowell foresaw Lewis' chance to take the crown. After Lewis' performance of "Lovesong" by The Cure/311 on March 27, Paula Abdul said that she would love to see him in the finale. Cowell further confirmed that Lewis was the front runner of male contestants on American Idol. Lewis, upon entering the top 2 on May 16, 2007, he thus became the first ever contestant from the Northwestern United States (specifically, Washington) to compete in the finale.

I've tried to stay true to myself this whole entire time, and I think I've represented myself as creatively as I could with what I got on the show.

— Blake Lewis, interview with MTV.com

Lewis' beatboxing and scat singing skills had been featured occasionally throughout the competition, notably in the performances such as "Virtual Insanity", "All Mixed Up", "Time of the Season", "You Give Love a Bad Name", "You Should Be Dancing", "This Is Where I Came In" and "This Love". He had also rearranged songs including "You Keep Me Hangin' On" and "You Give Love a Bad Name". Although Lewis' first performance in the semi-final weeks, "Somewhere Only We Know", was pure singing and inspired judges to make comments about his contemporary vibe, his signature performance on the show was probably "You Give Love a Bad Name" by Bon Jovi. Lewis incorporated a substantial beatboxing component, making the song sound significantly different from its original version. Jon Bon Jovi, the lead singer of the band who also coached the contestants that week, noted that Lewis' rendition was "rolling the dice". All three judges acknowledged the huge risk of Lewis' arrangement, but also praised him for his originality including beatboxing. Randy Jackson believed that it was the most original performance ever on the show. Cowell even predicted that 50% of the audience "would absolutely hate it" but another half would love it. The groundbreaking performance was later ranked number six in top 20 all-time greatest American Idol performances on AOL.com.

Several original versions of songs Lewis performed re-entered Billboard Hot Digital Songs chart shortly after the show. Lewis' first performance on-stage, "Somewhere Only We Know" by Keane, re-entered the chart at number 26 (number 19 on Hot Digital Tracks chart); "Time of the Season", a The Zombies' hit in 1968, reached number 67; Ryan Adams's "When the Stars Go Blue" hit number 39 (number 37 on Hot Digital Tracks chart); Bon Jovi's "You Give Love a Bad Name" shot up to number 29; "This Love" and "She Will Be Loved" by Maroon 5 jumped to number 41 and number 45 respectively. Maroon 5's album Songs About Jane had re-entered the Top Pop Catalog Albums chart at number five on June 2, 2007, as well.

On May 11, 2007, Lewis visited his hometown, Seattle, Washington for the traditional Idol Top 3 hometown visits. He made numerous appearances at radio stations and then played a concert in Seattle at Westlake Center, including a performance of "Baby Got Back" with Sir Mix-a-Lot. He also visited the top of the Space Needle. Fans followed him to Bothell for a parade and concert at the Sammamish River Park. Afterwards, he proceeded to Safeco Field to sing the national anthem, "The Star-Spangled Banner", for the Seattle Mariners's Game.

Lewis claimed 311 as his all-time favorite band after his performance of "All Mixed Up". Responding to a viewer question on March 13, 2007, he had also confessed his love of "underground hip hop, electronic music" such as Common Market and Panda Conspiracy, with an addition of The Mob Law, which in Lewis' opinion, "should be signed to a major label".

While being the last two contestants waiting for the results on May 2, Lewis and Chris Richardson answered Ryan Seacrest's question about their close relationship, saying that they are best friends. Lewis has "Chris Sligh, Rudy Cárdenas", contestants from the sixth season of American Idol, listed as his own "American idols" on his profile on American Idol official website, while Sligh and Cárdenas also have Lewis on their lists. Furthermore, Lewis claimed in an interview with The Blaker Girls that besides Richardson, Cárdenas and Sligh, his best friends on the show were Brandon Rogers, Jordin Sparks and Gina Glocksen. In the episode of The View on June 14, 2007, Lewis said that there were "a lot of writers on the show", including Richardson, Sligh and himself.

Jimmie Walker Blue, his alter ego was introduced in the middle of the Idol.

=== Performances and results ===
Week	Theme	Song Choice	Artist	Order #	Result
Top 24 (12 Men)	N/A	"Somewhere Only We Know"	Keane	7	Safe
Top 20 (10 Men)	N/A	"Virtual Insanity"	Jamiroquai	7	Safe
Top 16 (8 Men)	N/A	"All Mixed Up"	311	1	Safe
Top 12	Diana Ross	"You Keep Me Hangin' On"	The Supremes	9	Safe
Top 11	British Invasion	"Time of the Season"	The Zombies	4	Safe
Top 10	No Doubt/Artists who inspire Gwen Stefani	"Lovesong"	The Cure	8	Safe
Top 9	American Classics	"Mack the Knife"	Bobby Darin	1	Safe
Top 8	Latin	"I Need to Know"	Marc Anthony	7	Safe
Top 7	Country	"When the Stars Go Blue"	Ryan Adams	7	Bottom 3^{1}
Top 6	Inspirational	"Imagine"	John Lennon	3	Safe
Top 6^{2}	Bon Jovi	"You Give Love a Bad Name"	Bon Jovi	4	Safe
Top 4	Barry Gibb	"You Should Be Dancing" "This Is Where I Came In"	Bee Gees	2; 6	Safe
Top 3	Judge's Choice (Paula Abdul); Producers' Choice; Contestant's Choice	"Roxanne" "This Love" "When I Get You Alone"	The Police; Maroon 5 Robin Thicke	2; 5; 8	Safe
Finale	Previous Song; New Song; Coronation Song	"You Give Love a Bad Name" "She Will Be Loved" "This Is My Now"	Bon Jovi; Maroon 5 Jordin Sparks	1; 3; 5	Runner-up

- ^Note 1 Lewis was saved first from elimination.
- ^Note 2 Due to the Idol Gives Back performance, the Top 6 remained intact for another week.

== Post-Idol ==
Lewis's songs from American Idol have been on sale at the iTunes Store and the American Idol official website as Blake Lewis - EP (called a "bundle" on Idol official website) shortly after the finale of Idol, along with other songs that did not make the EP's cut that are being sold as individual singles. Figures from SoundScan which were posted on USA Today indicated that Lewis' "You Give Love a Bad Name" was "the biggest-selling download of the season", with 192,000 copies sold.

After the finale of Idol, Blake Lewis has made several appearances on television shows. He performed Maroon 5's "She Will Be Loved" on The Morning Show with Mike and Juliet (combined with a snippet of U2's "With or Without You"), The Today Show, Live with Regis and Kelly and The Early Show. In the episode of The View on June 14, 2007, he sang "Somewhere Only We Know" by Keane. Lewis had also appeared on Total Request Live, The Morning Show with Mike and Juliet with the winner of Idol, Jordin Sparks and Larry King Live with contestants who made into the top ten of American Idol. On July 4, 2007, Lewis performed "God Bless America" and "America the Beautiful" on Macy's Fourth of July Fireworks Spectacular with Sparks and Melinda Doolittle.

Lewis took part in the "American Idols LIVE! Tour 2007" from July 6 – September 23, 2007, along with other contestants in the top ten. He revealed on The View on June 14, 2007, that all the male contestants on the show would be playing musical instruments on the tour (for the first time ever), "doing like a folk band," and that he would bring along his loop pedals for his beatboxing. Before several shows, Lewis improvised, got dressed up as a janitor character named Bob Bobberson and sometimes as a Pop-Tart. He performed "She Loves the Way" on the last show, becoming the first Idol who sang their pre-Idol original materials on the tour. He and Chris Richardson have "started working on a little documentary" on the tour and it will be published at their MySpace profiles.

Lewis was named number five in the list of the ten sexiest Idol contestants ever on the website during the running of the sixth season of American Idol and was ranked number 21 in the list of music's 21 sexiest single men on June 11, 2007, on AOL.com. Later in the issue of People magazine on June 15, 2007, the brand-new runner-up of Idol appeared on its list of "Hottest Bachelors of 2007". He has also made a cut on the list of 50 hottest guys on Elle Girl.

== Career ==
=== 2007–2008: A.D.D. (Audio Day Dream) ===
On March 6, 2008, he performed "How Many Words", from his album A.D.D. (Audio Day Dream), on the American Idol result show.

On the release of his second single, Blake Lewis spent much of his time promoting the single "How Many Words" at various radio stations. While Blake Lewis parted with his label, Arista Records, in June 2008, he will begin his national tour starting on the East Coast at the end of September with the help of 19 Recordings and will be playing songs from A.D.D. as well as new songs. Details about the tour can be found at Blake Lewis's Myspace page or the website of his official street team, the Blake Lewis Army.

Upon his record deal with Arista Records/19 Recordings which was announced officially on August 24, 2007, A.D.D. (Audio Day Dream), Lewis' "electro-funk-soul-pop" first studio album, was released on December 4, 2007. In fact, the singer has been recording his album in the studio "for all night long" since June 18. "Break Anotha", the first single from A.D.D., was released to radio on October 30, 2007, and on iTunes Store on November 13.

Blake's second single, "How Many Words" was released on March 10, 2008. A.D.D. has been made available at iTunes and includes his music video for his first single "Break Anotha". On June 25, 2008 Entertainment Weekly officially announced that Lewis was dropped by his label, Arista, but will remain on Idol creator Simon Fuller's 19 Recordings roster.

Lewis has said he's already written four songs for his second album, which he's working on with his band's drummer, KJ "Quantize" Sawka. The pair will be co-producing the effort, which Lewis describes as "Massive Attack meets Zero 7 – drum-and-bass with a little pop influence."

Lewis said he may release the disc through his own label, which he's in the process of getting off the ground. "I'm super-passionate about this record," he said. "Who knows what's in store? Half the year's over, and it's only going to keep going." According to MTV News, the album is expected to have the electronica genre like the first album, and "he is experimenting with his own music" by implementing blue-eyed soul, pop music, rock, jazz, emo, indie and some metal genre. It was also reported on KIIS-FM that Lewis will collaborate with Chris Richardson, KJ Sawka and Ryan "Alias" Tedder.

As of August 2008, the artist has added one song to his sophomore LP, which may be out on the last quarter of 2008 or first quarter of 2009. Lewis told the interviewers that he is very excited to premiere his new songs, and he has learned some lessons from his "A.D.D." era. On an interview, he said, "Where to start… Orchestral Drive-By: KJ and I are about 5 songs deep now. Can't wait for you all to hear this. I haven't been this excited in a while. I haven't been able to produce in a year and half, besides a couple songs on 'A.D.D.' and from what I have learned in the last year, it sure has paid off. STOKED!!!"

It was reported that Lewis has collaborated with his friends on the band, Project Lionheart at a track called "My Eyes" and "Hell Yeah". Aside from that, he also collaborated with Common Market's "Trouble Is", where he contributed backing vocals. Blake says who is currently producing his record with his drummer, KJ Sawka. Blake also recorded a track at 311 frontman Nick Hexum's house for the next album. Blake finished a charity song called "Selfless" with Darude for Dance4Life. In September, Blake was featured on a song for BT's album, which he says is a "throwback to Flock of Seagulls.". Blake has also been in Darude's song "I Ran" which hit the charts and is on local radio stations constantly.

=== 2009–2012: Heartbreak on Vinyl ===
On April 30, 2009, Lewis performed at the 2009 Congressional Clubs' First Lady's Luncheon to Honor Michelle Obama. He performed three songs including a beatbox version of "America the Beautiful".

His second album, Heartbreak on Vinyl, was distributed under Tommy Boy Records – a dance/hip hop/electronic label whose catalog includes albums by Africa Bambaataa, Biz Markie and De La Soul. He signed a deal on Tommy Boy Entertainment to record an electronica album.

The first single from the album, "Sad Song", was released on July 21, 2009. The album was released on October 6, 2009.

=== 2013–2015: Portrait of a Chameleon ===
On February 25, 2013, it was announced that Lewis has signed with Republic Records. He was going to release his third studio album Portrait of a Chameleon in spring 2013 and the first single "Your Touch" premiered on February 26, 2013, on a commercial for Internet Explorer 10. The song was released to iTunes on March 4, 2013.

On February 17, 2014, Blake Lewis officially announced that his new album would be released May 20, 2014, on his own record label, Audio Day Dream Records.

=== 2016–present: Strings, Spit, & Serenades, Our Fragile Heart: Remixes & Rarities and Wanderlust Unknown ===
In 2017, Lewis released Strings, Spit, & Serenades, a live album that included live versions of music from previous albums and a live version of "7 Nation Army Dreams" featuring Chris Poage.

In 2018, Lewis released a remix album featuring unreleased tracks and new remixes of former releases. The album includes mixes from KJ Sawka and Alex Greggs.

Lewis released his fourth studio album, Wanderlust Unknown, on January 24, 2020, featuring lead singles "Pot of Gold" and "Trouble". The album featured collaborations with fellow American Idol alum Elliott Yamin and new recording artist Olivia Kuper Harris. Blake also served as co-writer and producer for Olivia Kuper Harris' Juicy, and for Olivia Ryan's "New Warriors."

== Voice acting ==
Lewis made his voice acting debut in the English dub of the anime series Durarara!!, in which he voiced Kasuka Heiwajima; however, he was replaced by Vic Mignogna in the show's second season. Lewis had also voiced a character named Thump on one episode of Generator Rex.

== Philanthropy ==
Lewis has been supporting cancer research at Children's Hospital and Regional Medical Center in Seattle by donating 50% of the proceeds from the merchandise of The Blaker Girls. He chose to put his support behind this organization after a best friend of his as well as his friend's girlfriend were diagnosed with lymphoma. In 2010 Lewis competed on Don't Forget the Lyrics to raise money for the Seattle Children's Hospital, a charity that he has worked with for over ten years.

== Discography ==
=== Albums ===
Title	Album details	Peak chart positions			Sales
Title	Album details	US	US Indie	US Dance	Sales
A.D.D. (Audio Day Dream)	Released: December 4, 2007; Label: Arista; Format: CD, digital download	10	—	—	US: 309,000
Heartbreak on Vinyl	Released: October 6, 2009; Label: Tommy Boy; Format: CD, digital download	135	20	7	US: 10,000
Portrait of a Chameleon	Released: May 20, 2014; Label: Audio Day Dream; Format: CD, digital download	—	—	—	
Wanderlust Unknown	Released: January 24, 2020; Label: Audio Day Dream; Format: CD, digital download	—	—	—	
"—" denotes album that did not chart or was not released.

=== Extended plays ===
Title	EP details	Peak chart positions		Sales
Title	EP details	US Comp.	US Digital	Sales
Blake Lewis^{1}	Released: May 22, 2007; Label: 19 Entertainment, Fox Interactive Media	30	3	US: 46,000

Notes:

- ^{1} Since Blake Lewis was available exclusively through the iTunes Store, it was not eligible to chart on the Billboard 200.

=== Singles ===
Year	Title	Peak chart positions					Album
Year	Title	US	US Pop	US Dance	GER	UK	Album
2007	"You Give Love a Bad Name"	18	15	—	—	—	Blake Lewis
2008	"Break Anotha"	—	85	—	—	—	A.D.D. (Audio Day Dream)
2008	"How Many Words"	—	—	8	—	—	A.D.D. (Audio Day Dream)
2009	"Sad Song"	—	—	11	—	—	Heartbreak on Vinyl
2010	"Heartbreak on Vinyl"	—	—	1	—	—	Heartbreak on Vinyl
2010	"Till We See the Sun"	—	—	—	—	—	Heartbreak on Vinyl
2013	"Your Touch"	—	—	—	32	38	Portrait of a Chameleon
2014	"Retro Romance"	—	—	—	—	—	Portrait of a Chameleon
2019	"Pot of Gold"	—	—	—	—	—	Wanderlust Unknown
2019	"Trouble"	—	—	—	—	—	Wanderlust Unknown
"—" denotes single that did not chart or was not released in that territory.

=== As featured artist ===
Year	Title	Album
2012	"Stay in the Moment" (Daniel Wanrooy featuring Blake Lewis)	Non-album single

=== Postmodern Jukebox ===
Year	Title	Album
2015	"Radioactive"	Swipe Right for Vintage
2015	"Thong Song"	Top Hat on Fleek
2017	"Mr. Brightside"	33 Resolutions Per Minute
2024	"Superman"	

Notes:

- ^{1} While Jordin Sparks, the winner of the sixth season of American Idol, had "This Is My Now" as her official single, Lewis did not announce his choice of single officially, despite the fact that "You Give Love a Bad Name" was the highest-charting track among his "bundle" of songs available for downloading. "You Give Love a Bad Name" entered a number of charts.
- ² Unlike the debut songs of previous winners and runners-up of American Idol, all five songs that appeared on Blake Lewis (EP) were released digitally only, not physically.
- ³ While not being announced as a single, "Time of the Season", the song Lewis performed in the British Invasion week on American Idol, has debuted on the Billboard Hot 100 chart at number 99, the Pop 100 chart at number 74 and the Hot Digital Songs chart at number 70 in the issue of the charts on June 9, 2007. Several tracks by Lewis have made appearances that week on the Billboard Bubbling Under Hot 100 Singles chart and the Pop 100 chart as well, including "This Love" (number 2; number 80), "When the Stars Go Blue" (number 10; number 92) and "I Need to Know" (number nineteen on the Bubbling Under Hot 100 Singles chart).

=== Unreleased original works ===
- "Closer to Reason"
- "Emotional Waterfalls"
- "Give It to Me" (duet with Laura Blue)
- "My MySpace" (featuring The Sampler)
- "She Loves the Way" (produced by BT) – he performed the song on American Idols LIVE! Tour 2007
- "Drivin' Me Crazy"

=== Guest vocals ===
- 2003: Unexpected Arrival, "Julie" (featuring Blake Lewis); "Take Control" (featuring Blake Lewis) Both chorus's written by Blake
- 2007: Caleb Cunningham and K-Tone, "My Eyes" (featuring Blake Lewis)
- 2007: KJ Sawka, "Brotherhood of the Drum" (featuring Blake Lewis); "Move On" (featuring Blake Lewis); "WTO" (featuring Blake Lewis) (from the album Cyclonic Steel)
- 2008: Darude, "Selfless" (featuring Blake Lewis); "I Ran (So Far Away) (featuring Blake Lewis)
- 2009: DJ Dan, "Operator" (featuring Blake Lewis)

=== Cameos ===
- 2006: The Sampler, "The Chuck Norris Rap, The Harry Potter Rap, Snakes on a Plane Rap" (music video)
- 2007: Jordin Sparks, "Tattoo" (music video)
- 2018: Blair St. Clair, "Irresistible" (music video)
