= 30th Golden Disc Awards =

2016 South Korean music awards ceremony

- Date: January 20–21, 2016
- Location: Grand Peace Palace, Kyung Hee University, Seoul
- Country: South Korea
- Hosted by: Jun Hyun-moo; Kim Jong-kook; Seohyun; Krystal; Leeteuk

Television/radio coverage
- Network: QTV, JTBC, iQiyi

The 30th Golden Disc Awards ceremony was held on January 20–21, 2016. It was initially scheduled to be held at the Shenzhen Bay Sports Center in Shenzhen, China, but was instead staged at Kyung Hee University's Grand Peace Palace in Seoul due to security concerns. Jun Hyun-moo, Kim Jong-kook and Seohyun served as hosts on the first day, with Jun, Krystal and Leeteuk on the second.

== Criteria ==
The winners of the digital music and album categories were determined by music sales (80%) and a panel of music experts (20%). The Rookie Artist of the Year award was based on album sales (80%), a panel of music experts (10%) and online votes (10%), while the Popularity Award was based on online votes (80%) and album sales (20%).

== Winners and nominees ==
=== Main awards ===
Winners and nominees are listed in alphabetical order. Winners are listed first and emphasized in bold.

Digital Daesang (Song of the Year)	Disc Daesang (Album of the Year)
**Big Bang – "Loser"**; AOA – "Heart Attack"; EXID – "Up & Down"; Girls' Generation – "Lion Heart"; J. Y. Park – "Who's Your Mama?"; Kyuhyun – "At Gwanghwamun"; Red Velvet – "Ice Cream Cake"; Sistar – "Shake It"; Taeyeon – "I"; Zion.T – "Eat"	**Exo – Exodus**; Apink – Pink Memory; Beast – Ordinary; BTS – The Most Beautiful Moment in Life, Pt. 1; CNBLUE – 2gether; f(x) – 4 Walls; Jonghyun – Base; Shinee – Odd; Super Junior – Devil; VIXX – Error
Digital Song Bonsang	Album Bonsang
**AOA – "Heart Attack"**; **Big Bang – "Loser"**; **EXID – "Up & Down"**; **Girls' Generation – "Lion Heart"**; **J. Y. Park – "Who's Your Mama?"**; **Kyuhyun – "At Gwanghwamun"**; **Red Velvet – "Ice Cream Cake"**; **Sistar – "Shake It"**; **Taeyeon – "I"**; **Zion.T – "Eat"**; Apink – "Remember"; Baek A-yeon – "Shouldn't Have"; CNBLUE – "Cinderella"; Davichi – "Two Lovers"; Exo – "Call Me Baby"; f(x) – "4 Walls"; Gain – "Apple"; Gary – "Get Some Air"; Huh Gak – "Snow of April"; Hyukoh – "Comes and Goes"; iKon – "My Type"; Im Chang-jung – "Love Again"; Jonghyun – "Déjà-Boo"; Mamamoo – "Um Oh Ah Yeh"; MC Mong – "Love Mash"; Miss A – "Only You"; Naul – "Living in the Same Time"; San E – "Me You"; Shinee – "View"; Wonder Girls – "I Feel You"	**Apink – Pink Memory**; **Beast – Ordinary**; **BTS – The Most Beautiful Moment in Life, Pt. 1**; **CNBLUE – 2gether**; **Exo – Exodus**; **f(x) – 4 Walls**; **Jonghyun – Base**; **Shinee – Odd**; **Super Junior – Devil**; **VIXX – Error**; 2PM – No.5; 4Minute – Crazy; B1A4 – Sweet Girl; BtoB – Complete; Girls' Generation – Lion Heart; Got7 – Mad; iKon – Welcome Back; Infinite – Reality; Jung Yong-hwa – One Fine Day; Kim Sung-kyu – 27; Kyuhyun – At Gwanghwamun; Monsta X – Rush; Red Velvet – The Red; Seventeen – Boys Be; Shinhwa – We; Sistar – Shake It; Taeyeon – I; Teen Top – Natural Born Teen Top; TVXQ – Rise as God; Xia – Flower
Rookie Artist of the Year	Popularity Award
**GFriend**; **iKon**; **Seventeen**; **Twice**; CLC; Lovelyz; Monsta X; Oh My Girl	**Shinee**; List of nominees: 2PM; 4Minute; AOA; Apink; B1A4; Baek A-yeon; Beast; Big Bang; BtoB; BTS; CNBLUE; Davichi; EXID; Exo; f(x); Gain; Gary; Girls' Generation; Got7; Huh Gak; Hyukoh; iKon; Im Chang-jung; Infinite; Jonghyun; Jung Yong-hwa; J. Y. Park; Kim Sung-kyu; Kyuhyun; Mamamoo; MC Mong; Miss A; Monsta X; Naul; Red Velvet; San E; Seventeen; Shinhwa; Sistar; Super Junior; T-ara; Taeyeon; Teen Top; TVXQ; VIXX; Wonder Girls; Xia; Zion.T

=== Special awards ===
Award	Winner
Best R&B/Hip-Hop Award	San E
Best Rock Band Award	Hyukoh
Next Generation Award	Monsta X
Global Popularity Award	Exo
iQiyi Male Artist Award	Big Bang
iQiyi Female Artist Award	Taeyeon
Best Vocal Award	BtoB
Best Vocal Award	Jung Yong-hwa
