= Panorama (Taeyeon song) =

Single by Taeyeon

from the album Panorama: The Best of Taeyeon
- Language: Korean
- Released: December 1, 2025
- Studio: SM Aube (Seoul, original); Choi Sound Lab (Seoul, live studio session)
- Genre: Pop rock
- Length: 3:00
- Label: SM; Kakao
- Composers: Mary Josephine Young; Keith Varon; JT Foley; Alida Garpestad Peck
- Lyricist: Mola

Taeyeon singles chronology
"Letter to Myself" (2024)	"Panorama" (2025)	"Bansanka" (2026)

Music video
- "Panorama" on YouTube

"Panorama" (Korean: 인사; RR: Insa; lit. 'greeting') is a song recorded by South Korean singer Taeyeon for her first compilation album Panorama: The Best of Taeyeon. It was released as the album's lead single by SM Entertainment on December 1, 2025.

== Background and release ==
On November 17, 2025, SM Entertainment announced that Taeyeon would release her first compilation album titled Panorama: The Best of Taeyeon with the lead single "Panorama" to commemorate the tenth anniversary of her solo career on December 1. The music video teaser for "Panorama" was released on November 28, followed by teaser images for the song on November 29 and 30. The song and the music video were released alongside the compilation album on December 1.

== Composition ==
Lyrics for "Panorama" were written by Mola. Mary Josephine Young, Keith Varon, JT Foley, and Alida Peck made additional contributions to composition. The song is described as a pop-rock track that blends piano, synthesizer, drums, and guitar rhythms, with lyrics that express a greeting to both the past and the days ahead.

== Accolades ==
On South Korea music programs, the song received its first music program award in Show Champion on December 10, 2025.

== Credits and personnel ==
Credits adapted from the album's liner notes, for both original version and live studio session version.

=== Original ===
Studio

- SM Aube Studio – recording, digital editing
- SM Starlight Studio – digital editing
- SM Blue Ocean Studio – mixing
- 821 Sound – mastering

Personnel

- SM Entertainment – executive producer
- Taeyeon – vocals, background vocals
- Mola – lyrics
- Mary Josephine Young a.k.a. MaryJo – composition
- Keith Varon – composition, arrangement
- JT Foley – composition
- Alida Peck – composition
- Jsong – vocal directing
- Kim Hyo-joon – recording, digital editing
- Jeong Yoo-ra – digital editing
- Kim Cheol-sun – mixing
- Kwon Nam-woo – mastering

=== Live studio session ===
Studio

- Choi Sound Lab – recording
- SM Droplet Studio – digital editing
- SM Azure Studio – digital editing
- SM Blue Ocean Studio – mixing
- 821 Sound – mastering

Personnel

- SM Entertainment – executive producer
- Taeyeon – vocals
- Mola – lyrics
- Mary Josephine Young a.k.a. MaryJo – composition
- Keith Varon – composition, arrangement
- JT Foley – composition
- Alida Peck – composition
- Jung Dong-yoon – drums
- Choi In-sung – bass
- Kim Dong-min – guitar
- Hong So-jin – keyboard
- Choi Nam-jin – recording
- Jang Soo-yeon – recording
- Seo Kang-won – recording
- Kim Joo-hyun – digital editing
- Kim Jae-yeon – digital editing
- Kim Cheol-sun – mixing
- Kwon Nam-woo – mastering

== Charts ==
=== Weekly charts ===
Weekly chart performance for "Panorama"
Chart (2025)	Peak position
South Korea (Circle)	61

=== Monthly charts ===
Monthly chart performance for "Panorama"
Chart (2025)	Position
South Korea (Circle)	118

== Release history ==
Release history for "Panorama"
Region	Date	Format	Label
Various	December 1, 2025	Digital download; streaming	SM; Kakao

== See also ==
- List of Show Champion Chart winners (2025)
