= I (Taeyeon EP) =

EP by Taeyeon
- Released: October 7, 2015
- Recorded: 2015
- Studios: SM Studios, Seoul, South Korea
- Genres: Pop rock; R&B
- Length: 22:09
- Language: Korean
- Label: SM
- Producer: Lee Soo-man (exec.)

Taeyeon chronology
I (2015)	Why (2016)

Singles from I
- 1. "I" Released: October 7, 2015

I is the debut extended play by South Korean singer Taeyeon, released on October 7, 2015, by SM Entertainment. The EP was recorded at SM Studios in Seoul, South Korea, and was produced by Lee Soo-man.

== Background and release ==
In mid-2015, SM Entertainment announced that Taeyeon would release her first solo album later that year. The album's title track, "I", features popular rapper Verbal Jint and includes lyrics written by Taeyeon. The album was released via digital music websites at midnight on October 7, the physical copies sold in the stores on same day.

Due to her previous success recording ballads for Korean films and televisions, the public expected Taeyeon to promote the album with a ballad title track. The singer, however, chose a pop rock song and expressed that she wanted to "make [her] solo debut with good songs regardless of their genres." Discussing about her music styles for the album, Taeyeon noted that she purposely avoided "way over the top" songs, elaborating:

I tried not to be excessive. I tried to sing in more plain and light ways. I have to sing from the beginning to the end all by myself, so I should feel comfortable. So I didn't choose such reckless songs [flowery or high-pitched], and tried to avoid challenging, something too new.

== Music and lyrics ==
Lee Su-ho from South Korean online magazine IZM described I as a pop rock album with a balladic production. Meanwhile, Chester Chin from Malaysian newspaper The Star noted elements of soft rock on the EP, a genre that is contrary to Girls' Generation's common bubblegum pop and electronic sound.

== Reception ==
Professional ratings
Review scores
Source	Rating
IZM	3.5/5 stars
KpopStarz	Positive
The Star	7/10

Upon its release, I received generally positive reviews from music critics. Lee Su-ho from South Korean online magazine IZM praised the EP's pop rock and balladic musical styles; they further hailed I for showcasing Taeyeon as a talented vocalist. Chester Chin from The Star labelled the album as "a collection of dynamic K-pop confections" with "refreshing" elements of soft rock as opposed to Girls' Generation's signature bubblegum and electronic sound. He further deemed it as "a reflection of Taeyeon’s strength as a vocalist."

I was a commercial success in the singer's native country South Korea. It debuted at number two on the Gaon Album Chart for the week ending October 10, 2015. The following week, its position on the chart dropped one position to number three. The EP remained on the third position for a further week before dropping to number five on the chart issue dated October 25–31, 2015. Despite only charting at number two on the weekly chart, I was the best-selling album on the Gaon Album Chart of October with 100,923 physical units sold, and the fourteenth highest-selling album of November with an additional 10,098 copies sold. It became the sixteenth best-selling album of 2015 in South Korea, with sales figures standing at 119,576 copies. According to the Korea Music Contents Industry Association, I was the main contributor which helped SM Entertainment top digital music sales in South Korea during the fourth quarter of 2015.

The EP entered the Billboard World Albums and Heatseeker charts at number one and five, respectively, selling 2,000 copies in the first two days of its release in the United States. Additionally, I charted at number twenty-one on the Japanese Oricon Albums Chart.

== Track listing ==
Credits are adapted from Naver.

I
No.	Title	Lyrics	Music	Arrangement	Length
1.	"I" (featuring Verbal Jint)	Taeyeon; Mafly (Joombas); Verbal Jint	Myah Marie Langston; Bennett Armstrong; Justin T. Armstrong; Cosmopolitan Douglas; David "DQ" Quiñones; Jon Asher; Ryan S. Jhun	Myah Marie Langston; Bennett Armstrong; Justin T. Armstrong; Cosmopolitan Douglas; David "DQ" Quiñones; Jon Asher; Ryan S. Jhun	3:26
2.	"U R"	Jo Yoon-kyung	Matthew Tishler; Robyn Newman; Ben Charles	Matthew Tishler; Robyn Newman; Ben Charles	4:34
3.	"Gemini" (쌍둥이자리; Ssangdung-ijari)	Baek Geum-min (Song Carat); Lee Soo-jung (Song Carat); Mafly (Joombas)	LDN Noise; Carolyn Jordan; Alice Sophie Penrose	LDN Noise	3:41
4.	"Stress" (스트레스; Seuteureseu)	Mafly (Joombas)	Hyuk Shin (Joombas); Tiffany Evans; Marco "MRey" Reyes (Joombas); DK (Joombas)	Joombas	3:21
5.	"Farewell" (먼저 말해줘; Meonjeo Malhaejwo; lit. 'Tell Me First')	Lee Joo-hyoung (MonoTree)	Lee Joo-hyoung (MonoTree); Chu Dae-kwan (MonoTree)	MonoTree	3:43
6.	"I" (Instrumental)		Myah Marie Langston; Bennett Armstrong; Justin T. Armstrong; Cosmopolitan Douglas; David "DQ" Quiñones; Jon Asher; Ryan S. Jhun	Myah Marie Langston; Bennett Armstrong; Justin T. Armstrong; Cosmopolitan Douglas; David "DQ" Quiñones; Jon Asher; Ryan S. Jhun	3:24
Total length:					22:09

== Charts ==
=== Weekly charts ===
Chart (2015–2016)	Peak position
South Korean Albums (Gaon)	2
Japanese Albums (Oricon)	21
Taiwan (G-Music J-Pop)	2
US World Albums (Billboard)	1
US Heatseekers Albums (Billboard)	5

=== Year-end charts ===
Chart (2015)	Position
South Korean Albums (Gaon)	16

Chart (2016)	Position
South Korean Albums (Gaon)	93
Taiwan (G-Music J-Pop)	9

== Release history ==
Region	Date	Format	Label
South Korea	October 7, 2015	CD, digital download	SM Entertainment
Worldwide	October 7, 2015	Digital download	SM Entertainment
Taiwan	March 18, 2016	CD + DVD	SM Entertainment, Universal Music Taiwan
