= Break Anotha =

Single by Blake Lewis

from the album A.D.D. (Audio Day Dream)
- Released: October 30, 2007 (U.S. radio); November 13, 2007 (U.S. digital)
- Recorded: 2007
- Genre: Pop rock, funk, electronic, hip hop
- Length: 3:09
- Label: Arista
- Songwriters: Blake Lewis, Louis Biancaniello, Ryan Tedder, Sam Watters
- Producers: Blake Lewis, Ryan Tedder

Blake Lewis singles chronology
| "Break Anotha" (2007) | "How Many Words" (2008) |

"Break Anotha" is the official debut single of Blake Lewis, the runner-up on the sixth season of American Idol. Being the leadoff single from A.D.D. (Audio Day Dream), it was first leaked on October 29, 2007 via phone to fans who had signed up at the artist's web site. The single began to impact the radio on October 30 and was premiered on 106.1 KISS FM in Seattle. It was released on iTunes Store on November 13 and officially went for adds on November 20.

== Background ==
The song was cowritten by Lewis, Louis Biancaniello, Ryan Tedder (OneRepublic), Sam Watters and produced by Lewis and Tedder.

Lewis described the song as "funk/soul-inspired" and is influenced by certain musicians:

It's an explosion channeling my Michael Jackson, James Brown, and Curtis Mayfield. It's a real live track with a kind of sinister message that you have to watch yourself. It's about staying away from the evil side in all of us.

His friends have also involved in the production of the song:

The bridge goes into breakbeat funk, featuring my drummer, KJ (Quantize) Sawka. My two really good friends, T.J. Berry and Chris Poage of The Panda Conspiracy on Alto and Barry Sax and my guitarist Ryan Lava. It's so amazing to have my friends be a part of something so special.

== Music video ==
The video of "Break Anotha", which was directed by Sanji, premiered on December 6 on Yahoo! Music. Nonetheless, during an interview of Lewis with Jared Cotter on The Sauce of Fuse TV on December 5, a sneak peek of the video has been aired on the show. It was shot against a green screen and "has an interesting concept behind it", which in Lewis' words, "when you open Rorschach inkblot tests, how they have two different sides" and like "ink and water, and different effects behind me that come in".

== Responses ==
The single received generally favorable reviews from fans and critics:

- Chuck Taylor of Billboard Magazine depicted "Break Anotha", which has drawn 76,000 streams on the day it premiered on "AOL First Listen", as "a lightning rod of rock'n'funk, meshing busy, skittish production and enough tempo stops and starts to build one clever three-minute jam", as well as channeling Justin Timberlake "with fluffed harmonic layers and falsetto as he sings a rapid-fire lyric about a playa". He felt that "this runner-up is poised to win the big prize: song is a bull's-eye, the stylish 26-year-old has the looks of a teen idol, and clearly, AI [American Idol] fever has never been more prominent" and "the future looks mighty bright for full-length Audio Day Dream".
- Ken Barnes of USA Today commented that the song "sounds like a clever maximizing of Blake's musical inclinations in a contemporary pop context" and "seems to be aimed straight at the Justin Timberlake market, and - with a properly warm radio reception - it could hit the jackpot".
- Michael Slezak of Entertainment Weekly gave the single rave review, thought that it "sounds like it could easily hold its own on Billboard Hot 100", "not just a 'good for an Idol graduate' kind of single, but instead the kind of track I'd spend money to download" and predicted that it will be a "big hit".
- Blender Magazine believed that the single "lives up to the singer's daring reality TV persona" and "is semi-ridiculous, hyperactive and totally different from your typical Idol fare", giving a rating of 3/5.
- Bill Lamb from About.com thought that while "beatboxing is part of the mix", "Blake's vocals are front and center in the instantly funky mix" and he has "really enjoyed listening to 'Break Anotha'", although he was disappointed by the Audio Day Dream cover design.

"Break Anotha" has garnered reviews from Seattle Post-Intelligencer, The Detroit News and Boston Herald as well. While the reviewers got a vibe of Justin Timberlake from it, they all predicted that "Break Anotha" will be a successful single. The Detroit News even went further, writing that Lewis, with "one of the most exciting singles of the year", "will blow Sparks [Jordin Sparks, winner on the sixth season of American Idol] out of the water, if not in first week sales then in three months' time". However this prediction proved highly incorrect, since as of February 2008 (a full three months after the song's release) "Break Anotha" failed to enter the Hot 100, and failed to reach 100,000 in digital sales, while Sparks' first single "Tattoo" reached the top ten of the Hot 100 and has sold over 1,900,000 in digital sales to date.

== Chart performance ==
"Break Anotha" was released to radio stations on October 30, 2007 and debuted at number 197 on the Mediabase Top 40 chart, reaching an audience of approximately 150,000. Two days after the release, it entered the top 100, reaching an audience of nearly 266,000. The song was not added to radio playlists officially until November 20, 2007 and it reached number 40 as of December 19.

"Break Anotha" scored 11,000 downloads its first week, and has to date sold 85,000 in total. It debuted and peaked on Billboard Pop 100 at number 85 and Hot Digital Songs chart at number 97 in the issue of the charts on December 1, 2007. It also debuted and peaked on the Billboard Bubbling Under Hot 100 at number ten for chart week December 22, 2007. "Break Anotha" failed to reach the Hot 100.

| Chart (2007) | Peak position |
|---|---|
| U.S. Billboard Bubbling Under Hot 100 | 10 |
