= Portrait of a Chameleon =

Studio album by Blake Lewis
- Released: May 20, 2014
- Recorded: 2014
- Genre: Electronic; pop
- Label: Audio Day Dream Records

Blake Lewis chronology
Heartbreak on Vinyl (2009)	Portrait of a Chameleon (2014)

Singles from Portrait of a Chameleon
- 1. "Your Touch" Released: February 26, 2013

Portrait of a Chameleon is the third studio album by American singer-songwriter and American Idol sixth season runner-up Blake Lewis. It was released on May 20, 2014. Its first single, "Your Touch" was released on February 26, 2013.

== Track listing ==
No.	Title	Length
1.	"Start Again"	4:06
2.	"Back to Life"	3:22
3.	"Not Today"	4:09
4.	"Silence"	4:24
5.	"Grounds for Termination"	1:28
6.	"Your Touch"	3:53
7.	"I Want You" (featuring Samantha James)	5:14
8.	"Survivor"	5:18
9.	"Disco in Space"	5:27
10.	"Retro Romance"	4:27
11.	"Love, Love, Love..."	0:56
12.	"She Gives Me Her Love"	4:36
13.	"Runaway"	6:45
14.	"Lost in Heaven"	4:54

== Release history ==
Region	Date	Label	Formats
Worldwide	May 20, 2014	Audio Day Dream Records	digital download
