= Heartbreak on Vinyl (song) =

Single by Blake Lewis

from the album Heartbreak on Vinyl
- Released: January 26, 2010
- Recorded: 2009
- Genre: Dance-pop
- Length: 3:57
- Label: Tommy Boy Entertainment
- Songwriter(s): Lewis, Sam Hollander, Dave Katz and Ben Levels
- Producer(s): S*A*M, Sluggo

Blake Lewis singles chronology
"Sad Song" (2009)	"Heartbreak on Vinyl" (2010)	"Till' We See the Sun" (2010)

"Heartbreak on Vinyl" is a song by American singer-songwriter Blake Lewis, taken from his second studio album of the same name (2009). The song was written by Lewis, Sam Hollander, Dave Katz and Ben Levels, and produced by S*A*M and Sluggo. It was released as the album's second single on January 19, 2010 by Tommy Boy Records. The track is to date Lewis's most successful single, as it has reached the number-one spots on Billboard's Hot Dance Club Songs and Hot Dance Airplay charts in 2010. The single pays homage to record stores that closed down or went out of business and its loyal fans of vinyl records.

== Background ==
The song makes reference to Blake’s favorite Seattle record shop and was inspired by a fateful trip to New York’s Union Square Virgin Megastore — both no longer in business. As the song goes: “Heartbreak on vinyl, I’m missing you and how, Easy street is empty, The silence of the sound, I guess the turntables have turned one too many times.” Blake explains the inspiration for its lyrics: “When people would ask me what I’m addicted to, I always said ‘music.’ And while they’d laugh it off like it’s a cliché, I’m actually a complete shopaholic when it comes to records. I’d literally buy 10 albums a week for years, so when I went to that Virgin Records and it said ‘going out of business,’ my heart stopped.”

== Reception ==
"Heartbreak on Vinyl" has received favorable review from pressplus1: "The album opens up with the title track “Heartbreak On Vinyl” and immediately this is unlike any other post-Idol release, it explodes with a strong techno beat as Lewis croons along with the beat at a perfect pace. It seems Lewis has been digging through crates of old 80's dark pop because that's where he's found himself on this album."

== Music video ==
The song's accompanying video feature clips from films that were set in (or featured scenes from movies in which take place at) a record shop. The clips were from Empire Records, Pretty in Pink, This Is Spinal Tap, Airheads, Fast Times at Ridgemont High, Half Baked, and High Fidelity.

== Track listing ==
Heartbreak on Vinyl [The Remixes]

#	Title
1.	"Heartbreak on Vinyl (The Bimbo Jones Radio Edit)" 3:54
2.	"Heartbreak on Vinyl (LA Riots Radio Edit)" 3:49
3.	"Heartbreak on Vinyl (Chew Fu Radio Fix)" 3:49
4.	"Heartbreak on Vinyl (The Bimbo Jones Mix)" 6:40
5.	"Heartbreak on Vinyl (LA Riots Vocal Remix)" 5:42
6.	"Heartbreak on Vinyl (Chew Fu Extended Fix)" 5:44
7.	"Heartbreak on Vinyl (The Bimbo Jones Dub)" 6:08
8.	"Heartbreak on Vinyl (LA Riots Dub)" 5:42
9.	"Heartbreak on Vinyl (Chew Fu Radio Instrumental Fix)" 5:42

Heartbreak on Vinyl [The Remixes - Part 2]

#	Title
1.	"Heartbreak on Vinyl (Danny Verde Radio Edit)" 4:00
2.	"Heartbreak on Vinyl (Danny Verde Club Mix)" 8:19
3.	"Heartbreak on Vinyl (Danny Verde Dub)" 7:35
4.	"Heartbreak on Vinyl (Guy Scheiman Vocal Mix)" 7:00
5.	"Heartbreak on Vinyl (Guy Scheiman Dub)" 6:57

Heartbreak on Vinyl [The Robbie Rivera Remixes]

#	Title
1.	"Heartbreak on Vinyl (Robbie Rivera's Juicy Radio Edit)" 3:47
2.	"Heartbreak on Vinyl (Robbie Rivera's Juicy Vocal Mix)" 7:19
3.	"Heartbreak on Vinyl (Robbie Rivera's Juicy Dub)" 6:33
4.	"Heartbreak on Vinyl (Robbie Rivera's Afterhours Dub)" 7:52
