= Sad Song (Blake Lewis song) =

Single by Blake Lewis

from the album Heartbreak on Vinyl
- Released: August 18, 2009 (digital download)
- Genre: Electropop, dance-pop
- Length: 3:43 (radio edit); 4:29 (album version)
- Label: Tommy Boy Entertainment
- Songwriter(s): Hollander, S., Lewis, B., Katz, D.

Blake Lewis singles chronology
"How Many Words" (2008)	"Sad Song" (2009)	"Heartbreak on Vinyl" (2009)

Alternative cover
- Sad Song [Maxi-Single]

Alternative cover
- Sad Song [Remixes]

"Sad Song" is the lead single by singer-songwriter Blake Lewis from his second studio album Heartbreak on Vinyl, released on October 6, 2009, and has reached the number eleven spots on Billboard's Hot Dance Club Songs chart in 2009.

== Music video ==
"Sad Song" directed by Ana Veselic, has a very stylized look that blends a couple of different eras. Blake says: "The video is very film noir with an '80s feel to it, like we have the Maxell shot in there."

The video is shot as a 1940s film-noir style story about the end of a couple’s relationship, highlighted with some 40s-meets-80s style fashion and video editing. The female lead is played by Casey Carlson, who was also an American Idol contestant in the eighth season.

Blake says: "I was, like, Wow, this girl has the most beautiful face. It's very classic. So I reached out to her, and she said yes. We got the video done a couple weeks ago, and it turned out really, really well. I'm very proud of it"

The Video was released on September 21, 2009, one day prior to the official release on his MySpace.

== Track listing ==
Sad Song (Radio Edit)

#	Title
1.	"Sad Song (Radio Edit)" 3:43

Sad Song [Maxi-Single]

#	Title
1.	"Sad Song (Radio Edit)" 3:43
2.	"Sad Song (Jason Nevins Radio Edit)" 3:28
3.	"Sad Song (Pilotpriest Radio Edit)" 3:31
4.	"Sad Song (Craig C Radio Edit)" 3:55
5.	"Sad Song (Jason Nevins Club Mix)" 6:33
6.	"Sad Song (Jason Nevins Extended Mix)" 6:18
7.	"Sad Song (Pilotpriest Extended Mix)" 6:51
8.	"Sad Song (Craig C Master Blaster)" 7:29
9.	"Sad Song (Craig C Dubstrablaster)" 7:25

Sad Song [Remixes]

#	Title
1.	"Sad Song (Jody Den Broeder & Chris Cox Radio Mix)" 4:04
2.	"Sad Song (Jody Den Broeder & Chris Cox Club Remix)" 7:44
3.	"Sad Song (Jody Den Broeder & Chris Cox Dub)" 7:17
4.	"Sad Song (David Tort Vocal Mix)" 7:42
5.	"Sad Song (David Tort Dub)" 6:58
6.	"Sad Song (Andy Caldwell Remix)" 7:23
7.	"Sad Song (Andy Caldwell Dub)" 7:22

== Chart performance ==
"Sad Song" spent ten weeks on the Hot Dance Club Songs chart and has reached number eleven on November 14, 2009.

Chart (2009)	Peak position
U.S. Hot Dance Club Songs	11
