= How Many Words =

Single by Blake Lewis

from the album A.D.D. (Audio Day Dream)
- Released: March 10, 2008 (US radio)
- Recorded: 2007
- Genre: Pop, funk, hip hop
- Length: 3:34
- Label: Arista
- Songwriters: Blake Lewis, Sam Hollander, Dave Katz
- Producer: S*A*M & Sluggo

Blake Lewis singles chronology
"Break Anotha" (2007)	"How Many Words" (2008)	"Sad Song" (2009)

"How Many Words" is the official second single by the singer-songwriter Blake Lewis, from his debut album A.D.D. (Audio Day Dream). The song was expected to be followed by "Know My Name", and then "Without You". However, due to being dropped by Arista Records, "How Many Words" was the final single from his debut album. The single was released to mainstream radio format on March 10, 2008. Also, an EP featuring remixes of the song was released onto iTunes on May 13, 2008. Lewis performed the song live on the March 6, 2008, results show of the seventh season of American Idol.

Variety noted an "OMD-inspired" track that "really sounds like a synth song from 1986, except of course for the beat boxing".

== Chart performance ==
The single has sold 94,000 copies to date.

Chart (2008)	Peak position
US Dance Club Songs (Billboard)	8
