= Your Touch (Blake Lewis song) =

Single by Blake Lewis

from the album Portrait of a Chameleon
- Released: February 26, 2013
- Recorded: 2012
- Genre: Pop
- Length: 3:55
- Label: Republic Records
- Producers: Blake Lewis & Matt Lange

Blake Lewis singles chronology
"Till We See the Sun" (2010)	"Your Touch" (2013)

"Your Touch" is a song by American singer-songwriter and beatboxer Blake Lewis. The song was released in the United States as a digital download on February 26, 2013 as the lead single from his third studio album Portrait of a Chameleon (2013). It peaked at number 38 on the UK Singles Chart. The song premiered on February 26, 2013 in a commercial for Internet Explorer 10.

== Track listing ==
Digital download
No.	Title	Length
1.	"Your Touch"	3:55

== Chart performance ==
Chart (2013)	Peak position
Germany (GfK)	32
UK Singles (Official Charts)	38
US Dance/Electronic Digital Songs (Billboard)	19
US Dance/Electronic Songs (Billboard)	21

== Release history ==
Region	Date	Format	Label
United States	February 26, 2013	Digital download	Republic Records
United Kingdom	February 26, 2013	Digital download	Republic Records
