= A.D.D. (Audio Day Dream) =

Studio album by Blake Lewis
- Released: December 4, 2007
- Recorded: June–November 2007
- Genres: Pop rock; electronic; hip hop; R&B; soul
- Length: 52:44
- Label: Arista
- Producers: Blake Lewis; BT; David Hodges; J. R. Rotem; Louis Biancaniello; Mike Elizondo; Ryan Tedder; S*A*M & Sluggo; Sam Watters

Blake Lewis chronology
Blake Lewis (2007)	A.D.D. (Audio Day Dream) (2007)	Heartbreak on Vinyl (2009)

Singles from A.D.D. (Audio Day Dream)
- 1. "Break Anotha" Released: October 30, 2007; 2. "How Many Words" Released: March 10, 2008

A.D.D. (Audio Day Dream) is the debut studio album by Blake Lewis, the runner-up on the sixth season of American Idol. It was released in the United States and Canada on December 4, 2007. The first single is "Break Anotha" and was released to radio on October 30. The album did not leak as other artists' albums generally do, instead appeared in full first within the "Free Full CD Listening Parties" section on AOL.com on December 3, the day before the release.

== Background ==
On June 21, 2007, Lewis disclosed in his blog at MySpace that on top of the American Idol tour, he has "been in meetings with producers and writers" for his album, though his record deal with Arista Records/19 Recordings was not announced officially until August 24. He started to record his album in the studio "for all night long" from June 18 and co-wrote 12 songs out of 13 tracks (excluding the interludes) on Audio Day Dream.

An exclusive version of Audio Day Dream with a 17-minute documentary, which was shot by Ethan Newberry and Cisco McCarthy, Lewis' friends, is offered as a bonus video download by Wal-Mart with purchase of their specially marked CD. Another special edition of the album, which is tied with a bonus track called "Human", is available on iTunes Store. A trailer of A.D.D. was published on BlakeLewisComingSoon.com right before the leak of "Break Anotha".

== Musical influences ==
Lewis has stated in several interviews that he wanted his future album to have pop, electronic and jazzy hip hop feels to it, as he classified the sound as "electro-funk-soul-pop". He has also listed his ideal choices of producers and collaborators for his album in various interviews, including "Father of Trance" BT, Darkchild, will.i.am, Pro J, DJ Shadow, Dan the Automator and Gnarls Barkley. In interviews with Entertainment Weekly and Entertainment Tonight, he mentioned a collaboration with Doug E. Fresh, the hip hop/beatboxing legend Lewis beatboxed with to "The Show" in the Grand Finale of the sixth season of American Idol and received a standing ovation from the judges and the audience, as well as some of his musical influences, such as Maroon 5, 311, Duran Duran, Michael Jackson and Jamiroquai.

Lewis described some of the songs he has recorded on July 16, 2007:

I try not to be put in a box. I'm inspired by everything. I've got six tracks done. I've got a track that's very Erasure-sounding ("How Many Words"), a track that's Sting-meets-Neverending Story and a track that's very electro-poppy Depeche Mode. It's all over the map.

The singer gave another depiction of A.D.D. in the official press announcing its release:

This album is exactly how I wanted it to come out. It's like an '80s mix tape, with some hip-hop and electronic influences. I wanted to make a record where every song sounds like it could be on the radio, but my radio. 2000-'80s Blake radio is what I call it.

== Critical reception ==
Professional ratings
Review scores
Source	Rating
AllMusic	2.5/5 stars
Entertainment Weekly	C
Los Angeles Times	3/4 stars
People	3/4 stars

The album was met with mixed reviews. New York Daily News editor Jim Farber found that the album "works perfectly as pop, but which also has a sense of edge." He called A.D.D. (Audio Day Dream) "the best album by any Idol alum yet." The Los Angeles Times was quite impressed, stating "his singing on A.D.D. (Audio Day Dream) is fine; it gets the job done. Yet what arrests your ear are Lewis' ideas." Similarkly, Billboard's Jill Menze concluded that the album was "indeed a little all over the map, but, surprisingly, it works." Writing for The New York Times, Nate Chinen concluded that Lewis "has delivered a post-Idol statement likely to advance his personality, with all its jittery contradictions. There's a guest rapper (Lupe Fiasco), there are some beat-boxing displays (mercifully not many), there are power ballads and dance jams, breakup songs and come-ons. A little something for everyone, in other words, though it probably won't hold anyone's focus all the way through.

Gene Stout from The Seattle Post-Intelligencer felt that A.D.D. (Audio Day Dream) "offers a whirlwind of styles: hip-hop, rock, pop, funk, soul and R&B;, with an abundance of special effects." Less impressed, AllMusic editor Stephen Thomas Erlewine called the album "one of the more interesting Idol-related records, but so much commotion without construction is ultimately as forgettable as Jordin's pageant-winner trifle, and perhaps a little more tiring to get through, too." Chris Williman from Entertainment Weekly gave the album a "C" rating and wrote: "If Lewis could just find a way to integrate all his early-MTV influences (A Flock of Fat Boys?), well [...] that album wouldn't be great either — though it'd be less forgettable than this exercise in pop adequacy." David Wiegand from SFGate noted that "every song sounds pretty much the same and is equally forgettable [...] The album seems overproduced to make sure you hear as little of Lewis' voice as possible. He was better on Idol."

== Chart performance ==
In its first week of release, A.D.D. (Audio Day Dream) sold about 97,500 copies, debuting at number ten on the US Billboard 200, the same spot where fellow American Idol Jordin Sparks debuted, and number three on Billboard's Digital Album chart. It has sold 308,000 as of July 1, 2009.

== Track listing ==
A.D.D. (Audio Day Dream) rack listing
No.	Title	Writer(s)	Producer(s)	Length
1.	"Silence Is Golden... (Intro)"		Michael J. Mani, Jordan Omley	0:32
2.	"Break Anotha"	Blake Lewis; Ryan "Alias" Tedder; Sam Watters; Louis Biancaniello	Tedder; Watters^{[a]}	3:09
3.	"Gots to Get Her" (inspired by "Puttin' on the Ritz")	Lewis; Tedder; Irving Berlin; Kristal Oliver; Steph Jones	Tedder; Omley^{[a]}; Mani^{[a]}	3:09
4.	"Know My Name" (featuring Lupe Fiasco)	Lewis; Tedder; Josh Hoge; Wasalu Jaco	Tedder	3:58
5.	"How Many Words"	Lewis; Sam Hollander; Dave Katz	S*A*M & Sluggo	3:34
6.	"Surrender"	Tedder; E. Kidd Bogart	Tedder	3:43
7.	"Hate 2 Love Her"	Lewis; Tedder	Tedder	4:14
8.	"Without You"	Lewis; Sean Hurley; David Ryan Harris	Tedder; Watters; Biancaniello; Wayne Wilkins	4:22
9.	"Here's My Hello"	Lewis; Hollander; Katz	S*A*M & Sluggo	4:16
10.	"What'cha Got 2 Lose?"	Lewis; Jonathan Rotem; Chris Richardson	J.R. Rotem	4:06
11.	"She's Makin' Me Lose It"	BT; Alex Greggs	BT; Greggs^{[b]}	3:55
12.	"Bshorty Grabs Mic!"		Mani; Omley	1:08
13.	"End of the World"	Lewis; Tedder; Troy Johnson; Watters; Biancaniello; Omley; Mani	Radio; Tedder; Omley^{[a]}; Mani^{[a]}	3:33
14.	"1000 Miles"	Lewis; Mike Elizondo; David Hodges	Elizondo	4:17
15.	"I Got U"	Lewis; Tedder	Tedder	3:37
16.	"...I Choose Noise (Outro)"		Mani; Omley	1:06
Total length:				55:47

iTunes bonus track
No.	Title	Writer(s)	Producer(s)	Length
17.	"Human"	Lewis; Sam Hollander; Chris Richardson; David Katz	Lewis	2:58
Total length:				55:47

Notes

- ^{^a} signifies a vocal producer
- ^{^b} signifies an additional producer

== Charts ==
Weekly chart performance for A.D.D. (Audio Day Dream)
Chart (2007)	Peak position
US Billboard 200	10
US Digital Albums (Billboard)	3

== Release history ==
A.D.D. (Audio Day Dream) release history
Region	Date	Format(s)	Label(s)
Canada	December 4, 2007	CD; digital download	Arista
United States	December 4, 2007	CD; digital download	Arista
