= Laze & Royal =

American Alternative hip hop group

Laze & Royal/Bennett & Justyn
- Origin: Los Angeles, California, US
- Genres: Hip hop, pop
- Years active: 2006–present
- Labels: Capitol, Warner/Chappell Music
- Members: Laze; Royal

Laze & Royal, also known as Bennett & Justyn (and previously known as 2XL), is American production duo from Beverly Hills, California, composed of twin brothers Bennett Armstrong and Justyn Armstrong. Formed in 2006, the two also formed the musical group My Crazy Girlfriend in 2012.

== Discography ==
=== Albums ===
- Neighborhood Rapstar (2007)

=== Mixtapes ===
- 2009: When Worlds Collide Vol. 1 (hosted by DJ Vlad)
- 2009: Kiss Myself Goodbye (hosted by DJ Ill Will & DJ Rockstar)
- 2010: When Worlds Collide Vol. 2
- 2010: Kiss Myself Goodbye 2
- 2011: Loaded
- 2012: Wasted

=== Singles ===
Year	Song	U.S. Hot 100	U.S. R&B	U.S. Rap	Album
2006	"Kitty Kat" (featuring E-40)	–	–	–	Neighborhood Rapstar
2007	"Magic City" (featuring Candy Hill)	–	–	–	Neighborhood Rapstar
2007	"Magic City (Remix)" (featuring Cherish and Unk)	–	–	–	Neighborhood Rapstar
2011	"You and Me" (featuring Myah Marie!)	–	–	–	Hollywood Ate Me Alive!

Unreleased/released productions

- Kesha - "Let My Love Go"
- Kesha - "Leave It Alone"
- Kesha - "Ur Not My Daddy"
- Taeyeon - "I"
- Taeyeon - "Fire"
- Bruno Mars - "All She Knows"
- Tyga feat. The Game - "Switch Lanes"
- Tyga - "Echo"
- Tyga - "Circus"
- Tyga - "Where Am I"
- Melody Day - "Kiss on the Lips"
- My Crazy Girlfriend - "Crazy Stupid Love"
- My Crazy Girlfriend - "Go Fuck Yourself"
- 2XL feat. E-40 - "Kitty Kat"
- 2XL feat. LAX - "Know Better"
- 2XL feat. Cherish & DJ Unk - "Magic City"
- Laze & Royal - "Like a Pistol" (feat. Marty James)
- Laze & Royal - "Marilyn Monroe (feat. Tyler Sherritt)
- Eva feat. Gucci Mane - "Not My Daddy"
- Eva feat. Tyga - "Body on Mine"
- YG - "This Year" (co-produced with Antonio Jackson)
- Privaledge feat. Nipsey Hussle - "Cold"
- Atozzio - "Unhealthy Love"
- James Cappra Jr - "Down the Drain - Pretty Little Liars"
