= Fox Sports Interactive Media =

Fox Corporation subsidiary

Fox Sports Interactive Media, LLC
- Formerly: News Corp. Digital Media; Fox Interactive Media; Fox Sports Digital Media
- Company type: Subsidiary
- Founded: 2008
- Headquarters: Fox Network Center (Fox Studio Lot Building 101), 10201 W Pico Blvd, Century City, Los Angeles, California, United States
- Services: Online media
- Owner: Fox Corporation
- Parent: Fox Sports Media Group

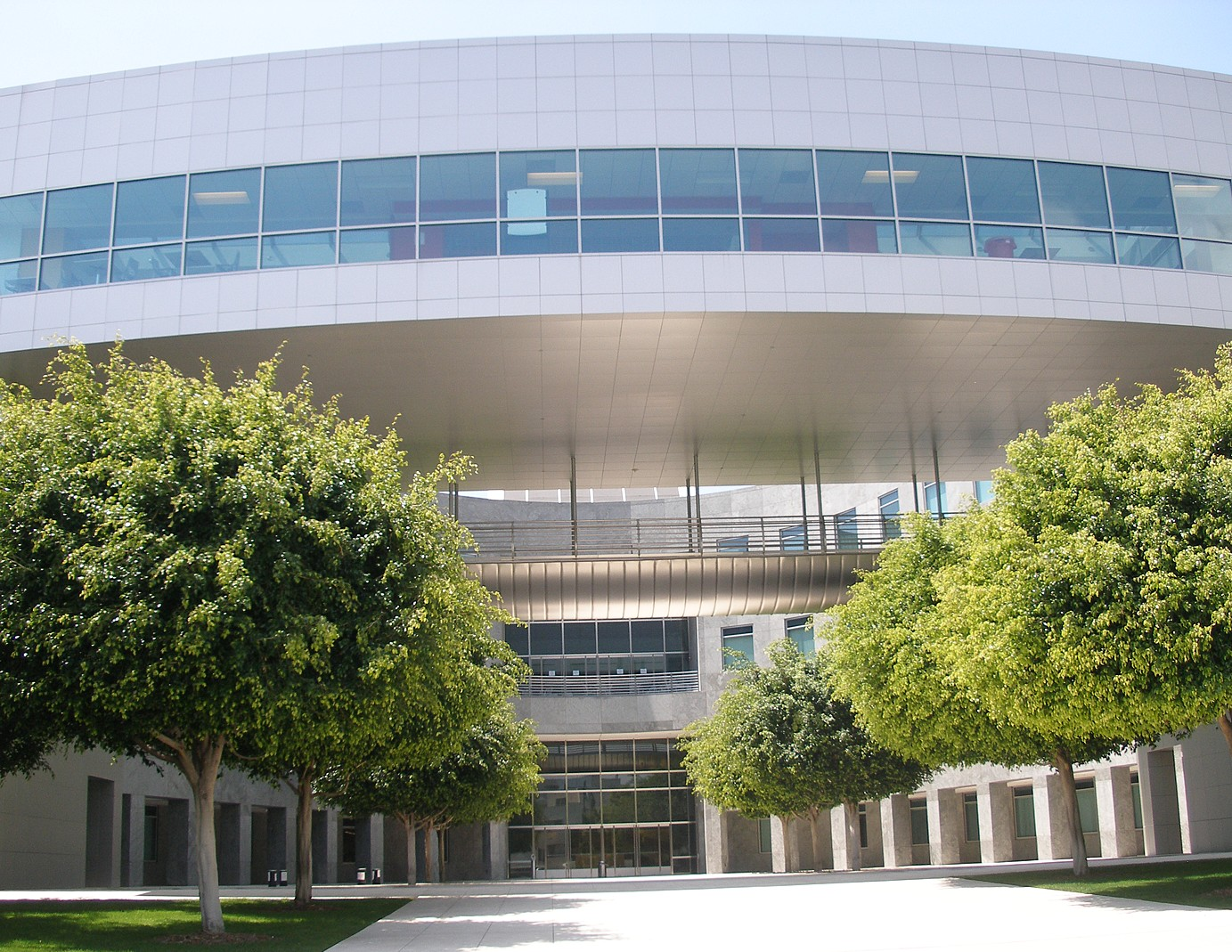
Fox Interactive Media's former headquarters

Fox Sports Interactive Media, formerly known as News Corp. Digital Media and Fox Interactive Media and Fox Sports Digital Media, is a subsidiary of Fox Sports Media Group which operates Fox Sports' online properties in the United States.

== History ==
Fox Interactive Media was formed in 2005 when News Corp CEO Rupert Murdoch handpicked a team of Fox executives to explore new ways to leverage the internet to distribute and monetize content. The team, composed of Ross Levinsohn, Adam Bain, Travis Katz and Michael Kirby, founded a new division, Fox Interactive Media. Murdoch set aside a war chest of $2 billion for the team to make acquisitions.

Fox Interactive evaluated a broad number of options, including CNET, Craigslist and Marketwatch, but eventually settled on a fast growing social media company, Myspace, as its flagship property. The division also acquired gaming site IGN, photo sharing site Photobucket, movie review site Rotten Tomatoes, career search site Simply Hired, as well as AskMen, and Scout Media. By December, 2006, on the back of these acquisitions, Fox Interactive Media had supplanted Yahoo to become the largest online property in the United States.

However, the group would later divest most of its properties; in 2006, Demand Media, a company run by Richard Rosenblatt, former CEO of Intermix Media and chairman of Myspace, purchased back all of the non-MySpace assets Intermix had sold to News Corporation. In December 2009, Fox sold Photobucket to the startup digital photography company Ontela. In October 2010, the Fox Audience Network was sold to ad technology firm Rubicon Project.

Fox Interactive Media also operated the websites of Fox's television stations. As part of a joint venture with LIN Media in 2008, Fox Interactive Media also began offering the Digital Publishing Platform (DPP), an enterprise content management system and hosting platform primarily intended for local station websites. The DPP products were later spun off as the independent company EndPlay, which Fox and LIN still hold equity interests in. Fox would begin outsourcing their television station websites to competing provider Worldnow in 2012.

In June 2011, Specific Media and pop singer Justin Timberlake bought Myspace for $35 million, which CNN reported noted was "far less than the $580 million News Corp. paid for Myspace in 2005." Murdoch went on to call the Myspace purchase a "huge mistake". In February 2013, IGN Entertainment was sold to Ziff Davis Media.

As its only remaining properties relate to Fox Sports, the company was renamed Fox Sports Digital Media in mid-2013.

In 2014, Fox Sports Digital Media and Sporting News Media entered into a partnership to create content, combine sales offerings and add to their respective ad networks.

In 2015, the company purchased assets in the sports start-up Straightcast Media.

Fox Sports Go, the company's online video arm, was spun off along with the Fox Sports regional networks to a Sinclair Broadcast Group-Entertainment Studios consortium in 2019, part of the acquisition of 21st Century Fox by Disney; Fox Sports Interactive Media retained video rights to the channels Fox Corporation continues to own. As part of a transitional license, Sinclair licensed the Fox Sports Go brand from Fox Sports Interactive Media until they developed the Bally Sports brand with Bally's Corporation; Fox Sports Go continued to link to Fox Sports Interactive Media properties while the license was in effect.
