= My Crazy Girlfriend =

American hip hop group

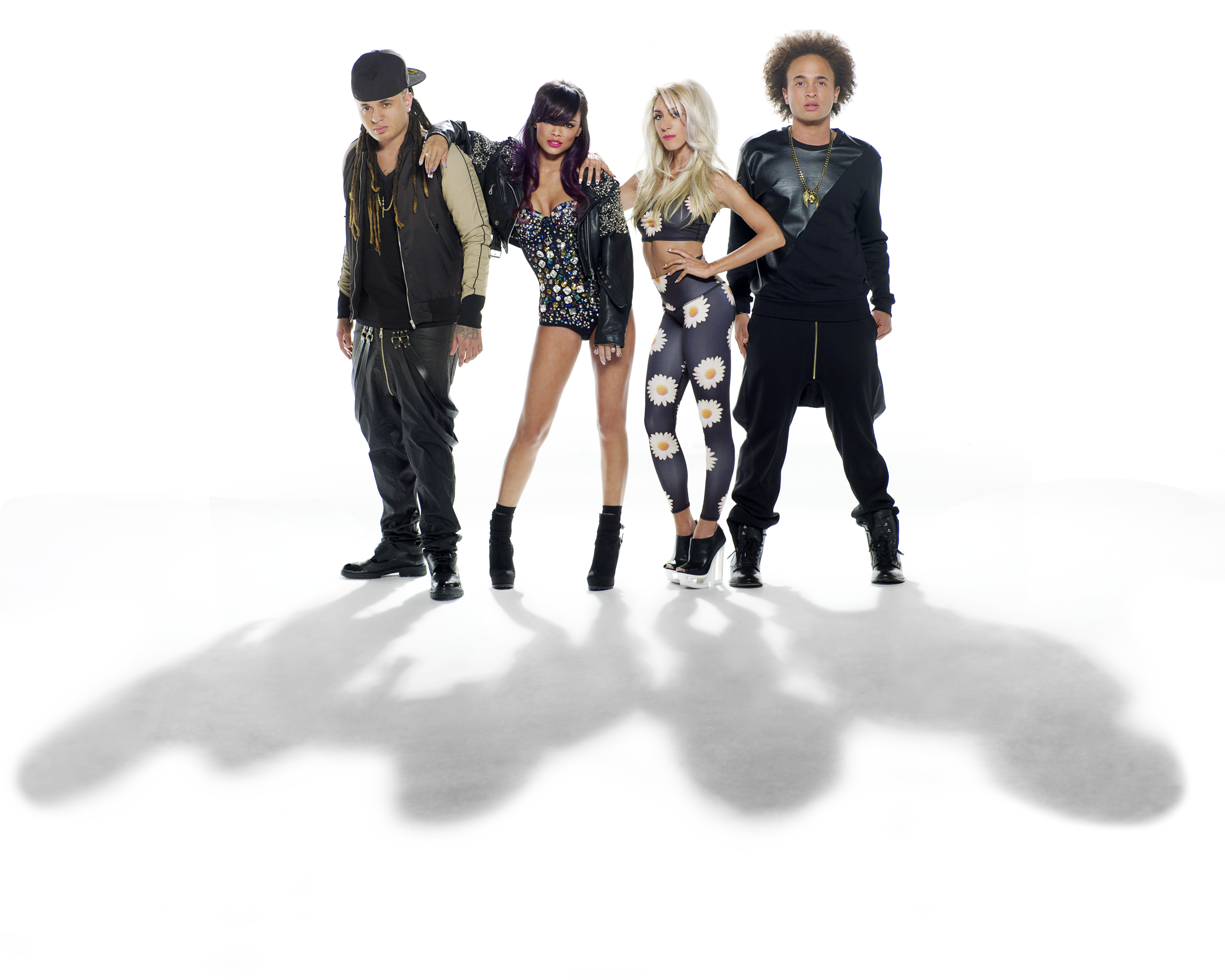

Background information
- Also known as: MCG
- Origin: Los Angeles, California
- Genres: Pop, hip hop
- Years active: 2012–2017
- Label: Capitol Records
- Members: Myah Marie; Cosmo Douglas; Justyn Armstrong; Bennett Armstrong

My Crazy Girlfriend was an American pop and hip hop band from Los Angeles, California composed of Myah Marie, Cosmo Douglas, and fraternal twins Bennett & Justyn Armstrong.

== History ==
My Crazy Girlfriend was formed in 2012 by Myah Marie, Bennett Armstrong, Justyn Armstrong, and Cosmo Douglas, all of whom had music careers prior to forming the group. Bennett and Justyn Armstrong are fraternal twins, sons of a Viennese pianist and a father who sung back up for the Platters. They were discovered by Tricky Stewart at the age of 11 and went on to form the duo 2XL, releasing a 2007 LP titled Neighborhood Rapstar. They have also collaborated with musicians such as Bruno Mars, Kesha, Chris Brown, Kara DioGuardi and produced the song "Switch Lanes" by Tyga featuring The Game. Myah Marie began singing at the age of two and writing songs at eight. She was contacted by a record label representative to write songs with the group 2XL while she continued to pursue her own sound, moving to Las Vegas to sing over dance tracks. Her performances prior to My Crazy Girlfriend includes collaborations with Britney Spears. She performed back-up vocals for Spears on multiple songs such as "Circus", "Hold It Against Me", "Till the World Ends" and "Work Bitch". Marie also wrote the song "Body Ache" for Spears' 2013 album Britney Jean, "Whatever We Want" by Havana Brown and penned the Lil Wayne single "Start a Fire" featuring Christina Milian in 2015. Cosmo is the daughter of a writer and rapper from the Seattle area and she was exposed to music at an early age. She moved to Los Angeles at the age of 18 and began working on her solo career as well as various music projects, teaming up with well-known dance producers such as R3hab, Jumpsmokers and Chris Cox.

The four met in 2008 and began writing together for their own solo projects as well as other acts. They later decided to form the group My Crazy Girlfriend.

They eventually signed with Capitol Records in August 2013 and released a promotional viral song, "Go F**k Yourself". That same year, the song peaked at number 1 on the Billboard Dance Club Songs chart. Their official first single, "Crazy Stupid Love", was released in March 2014 and peaked at number 38 on the Mainstream Top 40 and number 12 on the Dance Club Songs chart. The group began touring the same month on a promotional radio tour throughout the United States. On this tour, MCG played numerous Summer Jams, opening up for acts such as Jason Derulo, B.o.B and Hot Chelle Rae. The group parted ways with Capitol in 2015 and began work on an EP, Kings & Queens, released in February 2016.

== Discography ==
=== Extended plays ===
- Kings & Queens (2016)

=== Singles ===
List of singles as main artist, with selected chart positions, sales figures and certifications
Title	Year	Peak chart positions	Album
Title	Year	US Dance	Album
"Go F**k Yourself"	2013	1	Non-album singles
"Crazy Stupid Love"	2014	12	Non-album singles
"Roses & Cigarettes"	2014	—	Non-album singles
"Weekend"	2014	—	Non-album singles
"Fall Down"	2014	—	Kings & Queens

== See also ==
- List of Billboard number-one dance club songs
- List of artists who reached number one on the U.S. Dance Club Songs chart
