= Joshua (American singer) =

American singer (born 1995)

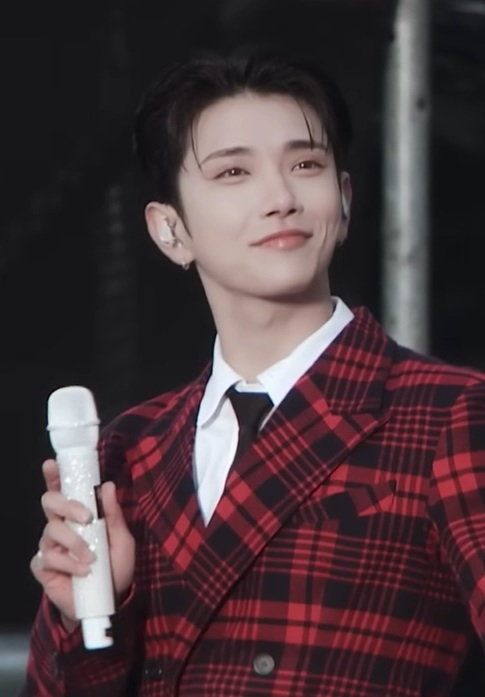
- Joshua in 2025
- Born: Joshua Hong; December 30, 1995 (age 30); Los Angeles, California, US
- Occupation: Singer
- Musical career
- Genre: K-pop
- Instrument: Vocals
- Years active: 2015–present
- Label: Pledis
- Member of: Seventeen; JxJ

Korean name
- Hangul: 홍지수
- RR: Hong Jisu
- MR: Hong Chisu

Joshua Hong (born December 30, 1995) is an American singer based in South Korea. Managed by Pledis Entertainment, he is a member of the South Korean boy band Seventeen, its vocal team, and its subunit JxJ.

== Early life ==
Joshua Hong was born in Los Angeles on December 30, 1995. He attended Downtown Magnets High School and graduated in 2013. Growing up, he attended church in Los Angeles' Koreatown.

== Career ==
=== 2013–2014: Pledis training and pre-debut ===
In 2012, at the age of 16, Joshua was approached by a K-pop scout while attending the Los Angeles Korean Festival. The scout arranged for him to record an audition video for Pledis Entertainment, after which he was invited to South Korea for the company to assess his potential. He was given a plane ticket to South Korea, and moved from Los Angeles to Seoul in 2013. He trained with Pledis for about a month before being accepted as a trainee.

Although Joshua had learned some Korean through a Korean church before moving to South Korea, he struggled with the language after arriving, improving through singing practice, studying lyrics and conversations with the other members.

As a trainee, he joined from the second season onwards of Seventeen TV, an online reality show that introduced Pledis' trainees and showed potential members of the boy group Seventeen before their official debut. The show was broadcast periodically on Ustream, where the trainees showed themselves training, singing, creating choreographies and playing games. The online show also included participation in concerts, titled Like Seventeen.

=== 2015–present: Seventeen and solo activities ===
In 2015, Joshua debuted as a member of the South Korean boy group Seventeen with the extended play 17 Carat on May 29.

In 2020, Joshua and bandmate DK collaborated with American musician Pink Sweats on a remix of his song "17". In June 2022, Joshua released a cover of Dhruv's "Double Take" as a part of Seventeen's #17Studio series. In 2023, Joshua and his bandmate Hoshi were cast in TVING's reality show Bro and Marble in Dubai alongside Yoo Yeon-seok, Lee Dong-hwi, Kyuhyun, Jee Seok-jin, Jo Se-ho and Lee Seung-gi. The show began airing in July that year, with Joshua and Hoshi's performances being well received.

In March 2023, Joshua released two song covers as part of Apple Music's Home Session series. He was the first K-pop artist to be featured in the series. In July 2023, Joshua worked with Apple Music again, alongside bandmate Vernon, hosting an Apple Music 1 summer themed radio show titled Summer Vacation With Joshua and Vernon of Seventeen. In August, alongside bandmates DK and Dino, Joshua was featured on New Kids On The Block's remix to their 2008 song "Dirty Dancing", released as a part of a commemoration of the 15th anniversary of the album The Block's release.

=== 2024–present: Solo activities, global collaborations, and soundtracks ===
In May 2025, Joshua released his definitive official studio solo track, "Fortunate Change," as part of Seventeen's 10th-anniversary studio album, HAPPY BURSTDAY. The indie-pop track showcased his distinct acoustic sensibilities and vocal progression over his decade-long career.

Joshua aggressively expanded his global profile through international collaborations during this period. In early 2025, he partnered with American electronic duo SLANDER for a vocal remix of their anthem "Love Is Gone." He also collaborated with the indie artistic collective Lola James Harper on the track "So Many Roads."

In May 2026, Joshua made his feature film soundtrack debut on the Netflix film K-Pops!, directed by Anderson .Paak. He collaborated with American singer Corbyn Besson (formerly of Why Don't We) on the single "One More Dance," a mid-tempo R&B-funk track. On July 6, Pledis Entertainment announced that Joshua would be making his first sub-unit debut alongside fellow vocalist Jeonghan. The agency stated that the duo are actively preparing a new unit album slated for an October 2026 release, marking Seventeen's seventh official sub-unit project. The duo released their first mini album, Dreamscape on October 19.

== Other ventures ==
=== Endorsements ===
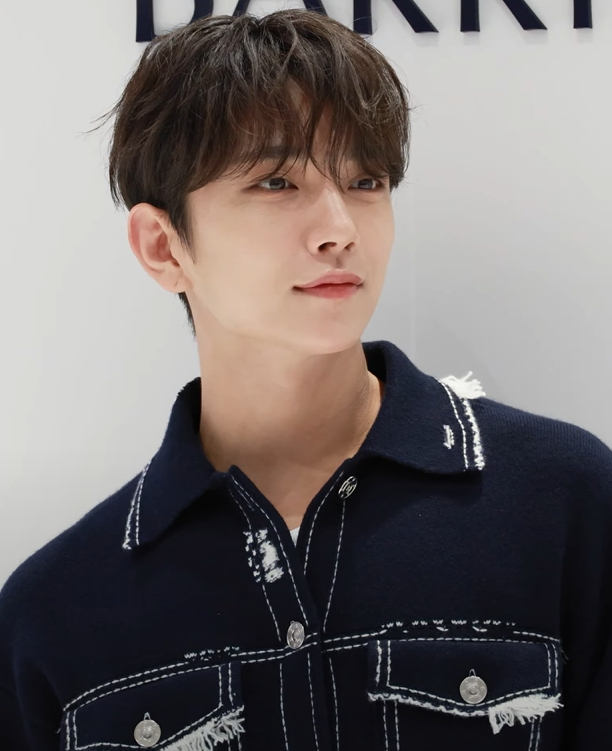
Joshua for Barrie in 2024

In May 2022, Joshua, alongside bandmate Seungkwan, was announced as a model for Laneige's "Neo Cushion" line. In December 2023, Joshua was announced as an ambassador for Givenchy Beauty.

In March 2026, Joshua expanded his global commercial footprint in the beauty and skincare industries. On March 3, 2026, he was announced as the brand ambassador for the Korean medical skincare brand Real Barrier across South Korea and Japan, with the parent company citing his stable and clean public image. On March 18, 2026, French luxury cosmetics brand Make Up For Ever officially appointed Joshua as their regional brand ambassador.

=== Fashion ===
In February 2023, Joshua attended Italian fashion house Marni's Fall/Winter 2023 runway show in Tokyo. Later that year, he attended the brand's womenswear Spring 2024 show in Paris. In March 2024, Joshua was announced as the newest brand ambassador for Scottish cashmere brand Barrie.

Joshua has established a prominent solo portfolio within international luxury fashion and beauty. In 2025, he actively expanded his global fashion footprint by attending Milan Fashion Week on September 24 to represent Onitsuka Tiger for their Spring/Summer 2026 showcase, followed by a high-profile appearance at Paris Fashion Week on October 3 for the Givenchy Womenswear Spring/Summer 2026 runway show. In February 2026, Joshua traveled to San Francisco to attend the gray carpet and live presentation for the second annual GQ Bowl x Thom Browne Fall 2026 fashion show held at the Legion of Honor Museum. In May 2026, he participated in the prominent Vogue China Vacation "Vogue Valley Holiday" event, held at Rissai Valley in Jiuzhaigou, China.

In June 2026, Joshua was officially announced as a "Friend of the House" for the Swiss luxury watchmaker Jaeger-LeCoultre, with the partnership launched alongside the brand's intimate video profile series The Hour Before. That same month, he traveled to Paris Men's Fashion Week to represent the American luxury fashion house Amiri as a primary guest at their Spring/Summer 2027 runway presentation.

== Filmography ==
=== Web shows ===
Year	Title	Role	Ref.
2013–2014	Seventeen TV	Cast member	
2023	Bro & Marble	Cast member	

=== Web series ===
Year	Title	Role	Notes	Ref.
2019	A-Teen 2	Ryu Joo-ha's friend	Cameo (Ep. 7)	
2025	BYOB	Guest	Season 3, episode 2	

== Discography ==
=== As lead or featured artist ===
Title	Year	Album
"17" (Remix) Pink Sweats featuring Joshua and DK	2020	Non-album single
"Dirty Dancing" (Dem Jointz remix) New Kids on the Block with Joshua, DK and Dino	2023	The Block 2023 Rerelease
"Love Is Gone" (with Slander)	2025	Non-album single
"So Many Roads" (with Lola James Harper)	2025	Non-album single
"耳朵 (Ear)"	2026	Non-album single

=== Other charted songs ===
Title	Year	Peak chart positions	Album
Title	Year	KOR	Album
"Fortunate Change" (Note: Credited under Seventeen but is a solo track performed by Joshua.)	2025	25	Happy Burstday

=== Song covers ===
Title	Year	Album	Notes	Ref
"Double Take"	2022	Dhruv cover	Non-album single	
"7PM"	2023	Apple Music Home Session: Joshua	BSS cover	
"Kids Are Born Stars"	2023	Apple Music Home Session: Joshua	Lauv cover	
"Free Love"	2025	Non-album single	Honne cover	

=== Soundtrack appearances ===
Title	Year	Peak chart positions	Album
Title	Year	KOR	Album
"A-Teen" with Vernon, Hoshi, Woozi, and Dino	2018	17	A-Teen OST
"Rocket" (English ver.) with Vernon	2018	—	Idol Hits OST
"Sweetest Thing" with Wonwoo, DK, Seungkwan, and Dino	2019	—	Chocolate OST
"Warrior" (逆燃) with Vernon, Jun, The8, and Mingyu	2021	—	Falling Into Your Smile OST
"Our Vacation" with Lee Seung-gi, Yoo Yeon-seok, Kyuhyun, Jee Seok-jin, Lee Dong-hwi, Jo Se-ho and Hoshi	2023	—	Bro and Marble in Dubai OST
"Shingiru" (신기루) with Hoshi	2023		Bro and Marble in Dubai OST
"One More Dance" with Corbyn Besson	2026	—	K-Pops!
"—" denotes releases that did not chart or were not released in that region.

== Composition credits ==
All credits are adapted from the Korea Music Copyright Association unless stated otherwise.

Year	Artist	Song	Album	Lyrics		Music	
Year	Artist	Song	Album	Credited	With	Credited	With
2017	Bumzu	"Just" (English Version)	27	Yes	Bumzu, Vernon, G-HIGH, L-BELLE	No	—N/a
2017	Seventeen	"Rocket" (Joshua and Vernon)	Teen, Age	Yes	Woozi, Vernon, Nathan	No	—N/a
2017	Seventeen	"We Gonna Make It Shine" (Vocal Team)	Non-album single	Yes	Bumzu, Woozi, DK, Seungkwan, Jeonghan	No	—N/a
2018	Seventeen	"Falling for U" (Jeonghan and Joshua)	Director's Cut	Yes	Bumzu, Woozi, Jeonghan	Yes	Bumzu, Jeong Jaewon, Woozi, Jeonghan
2020	Seventeen	"Ah! Love" (S.Coups, Jeonghan and Joshua)	Semicolon	Yes	Bumzu, S.Coups, Woozi, Jeonghan	No	—N/a
2021	Seventeen	"Rock with You"	Attacca	Yes	Bumzu, Kim In-hyung, Woozi, Vernon, Tim Tan, Jordan Witzigreuter, Cameron Walker-Wright	No	—N/a
2021	Seventeen	"2 Minus 1" (Joshua and Vernon)	Attacca	Yes	Bumzu, Vernon	Yes	Bumzu, Woozi, Vernon, HEY FARMER
2021	Seventeen	"In The Soop"	Non-album single	Yes	Woozi, Wonwoo, Dino, Hoshi, Mingyu, DK, Jeonghan	No	—N/a
