= United World College of South East Asia =

International School in Singapore

- Dover: 1207 Dover Road; Singapore 139654; East: 1 Tampines Street 73; Singapore 528704; Singapore

Information
- Type: International school; Day & boarding school
- Established: 1971; 55 years ago
- College President: Nick Alchin
- Teaching staff: 610
- Grades: K-12
- Enrolment: 6,030
- Student to teacher ratio: 9.11:1
- Education system: UWCSEA designed curriculum, IB Diploma, Systems Transformation
- Campus type: Urban
- Colours: Light blue, Teal, Blue, and White
- Mascot: Phoenix (Dover campus); Dragon (East campus)
- Accreditation: CIS; Edexcel; CAIE; WASC; CPE
- Affiliation: United World Colleges Round Square; EARCOS
- Website: https://www.uwcsea.edu.sg/

United World College of South East Asia (UWCSEA) is an independent international school in Singapore. It is a member of the United World College (UWC) movement, which includes 18 schools worldwide. UWCSEA provides a K–12 education consisting of five interlinking elements: academics, activities, outdoor education, personal and social education, and service. The UWCSEA learning program leads to the UWC Program in Grades 9 and 10 and the IB Diploma in Grades 11 and 12. In August 2024, the first cohort of a new IB "systems transformation pathway" began; UWCSEA was one of the first schools in the world to participate in the pilot program, along with UWC Atlantic, Mulgrave School, and Upper Canada College. The program is set to be set for mainstream offer for first teaching in 2030.

The school has two campuses, with 3,100+ students at the Dover Campus and 2,800+ at the East Campus in Tampines. Most students participate in service and Global Concerns programs, which involves service to the school community, the Singaporean community, as well as overseas communities.

UWCSEA is different from many of its sister colleges in the UWC movement, most of which are wholly boarding institutions that offer only a two-year International Baccalaureate Diploma Programme for mainly scholarship students of around 16–19 years of age. UWCSEA admits students from the age of 4, and the majority of students are children with parents who are expatriates or immigrants in Singapore.

There are more than 300 boarders from 76 countries across both campuses, and there are over 100 students from 47 countries in grades 8-12 who are supported by scholarships. Singapore government policy prevents most citizens from attending international schools within the country, and therefore UWCSEA has the smallest percentage of local students of any UWC. There are 44 nationalities represented in the teaching staff, and there are 117 student nationalities.

== History ==
The site on which the Dover Campus now stands was previously occupied by St John's School, run by the British Families Education Service for the families of British military personnel. After the British military withdrawal in 1971, the land was repurposed for the creation of a private school. The Singapore International School was officially opened in 1971 by Singapore's Prime Minister Lee Kuan Yew.

It was affiliated with the United World College movement, and formally became a member of the movement in 1975, changing its name to the United World College of South East Asia. Originally a secondary-only school, UWCSEA Dover today has a primary section that takes students as young as 4 (starting 1998). The total number of students on the Dover Campus (Kindergarten 1 – Grade 12) is now 3,000+. UWCSEA's East Campus opened its doors on 1 September 2008 in a transitional campus in Ang Mo Kio. The East Infant School moved to its permanent home at the Tampines campus in 2010, and the rest of the grades followed. As of 2026, both campuses have a combined student population of 6,030 students from 117 countries.

The Dover campus is one of a few remaining structures in Singapore that was constructed with bricks from the old Alexandra Brick Works, located at the school's Heritage Cafe, where hundreds of bricks stamped with “Alexandra” were found.

== Dover Campus move to Tengah ==
UWCSEA's lease on Dover campus ends in 2032; plans to develop in Tengah (further west) have been confirmed. The 50,000m^{2} plot will have the completed project by the time the Dover Campus lease ends. Preliminary actions such as an environmental impact assessment have been completed; of 247 flora species observed, 27 were deemed of "conservation significance" (including Ischaemum rugosum, previously thought to be nationally extinct).

== Notable alumni ==
There are over 25,000 UWCSEA alumni around the world.

Notable alumni include:

- Wan Hisham (born 1956) – Malaysian politician
- Kenneth Jeyaretnam (1959–2026) – Singaporean politician and son of J. B. Jeyaretnam
- Robert Milton (born 1960) – former chairman of Air Canada, chairman of the board of directors of United Airlines Holdings
- Philip Jeyaretnam (born 1964) – Singaporean writer, lawyer and son of J. B. Jeyaretnam
- Eric Khoo (born 1965) – Singapore film director and son of Khoo Teck Puat
- Tim Jarvis – environmental scientist, adventurer, and author
- Anya Major (born 1966) – model and actress, best known for throwing a sledgehammer in Apple's "1984" commercial
- Akihiko Hoshide (born 1968) – Japanese astronaut
- Wong Chen (born 1968) – Malaysian politician
- Princess Anita of Orange-Nassau, van Vollenhoven-van Eijk (born 1969) – Dutch princess by marriage
- Kevin Stea (born 1969) – Hollywood dancer and choreographer
- Sean Ghazi (born 1969) – Malaysian actor and music artist
- Paula Malai Ali (born 1974) – Bruneian television presenter
- Jason Lo (born 1975) – Malaysian music artist and media personality
- Patrick Grove (born 1975) – Australian entrepreneur and television personality
- Khairy Jamaluddin (born 1976) – Malaysian politician, former Minister for Youth & Sports
- Daniel Bennett (born 1978) – professional soccer player for the Singapore national football team and in Singapore's S.League
- Tengku Muhammad Fakhry Petra (born 1978) – Crown Prince of Kelantan
- Sarah Tan (born 1980) – veejay on Channel V
- Blair McDonough (born 1981) – Australian actor
- James Wong (born 1981) – botanist and BBC television presenter
- Nadiem Makarim (born 1984) – founder and former CEO of Go-jek Indonesia, Minister of Education
- Zak Whitbread (born 1984) – professional soccer player for the US national team
- Sonam Kapoor (born 1985) – Bollywood actress
- Jawar Mohammed (born 1986) – Ethiopian politician, founder of Oromia Media Network
- Eric Po-Ju Huang (born 1990) – Taiwanese actor
- Mayumi Raheem (born 1991) – Sri Lankan national swimmer
- Fiona Fussi (born 1996) – model
- Dhruv Sharma (born 1999) - singer, best known for the song "Double Take"
- Nysa Devgan (born 2003) – daughter of Kajol and Ajay Devgan
