= Jeong =

Jeong (Korean: 정) may refer to:

- Jung (Korean surname)
- Jeong (given name)
- Qing (concept), concept from Neo-Confucian philosophy
