= Philip Jeyaretnam =

Singaporean judge, lawyer and writer

The Honourable Philip Jeyaretnam SC BBM
- பிலிப் ஜெயரத்தினம்
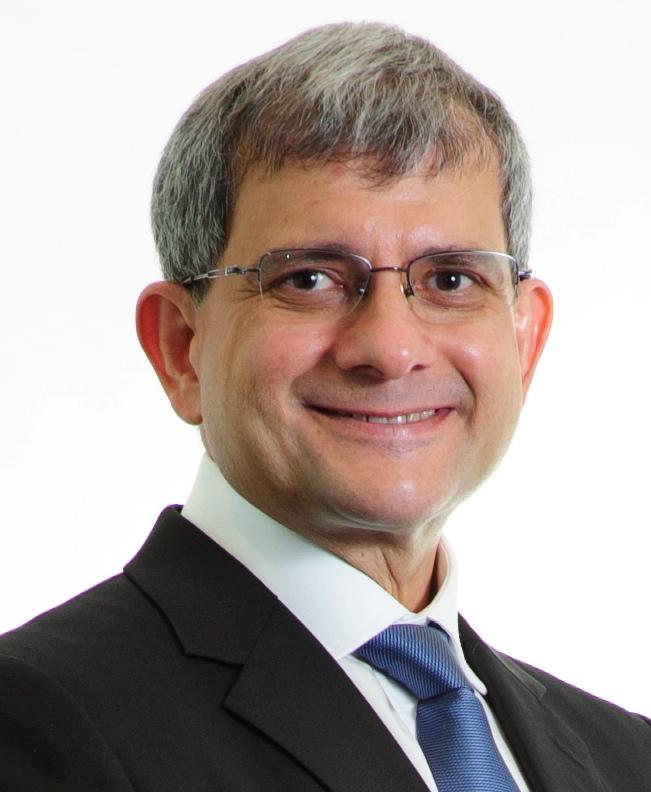
- Jeyaretnam in 2013

Judge of the High Court of Singapore
- Incumbent
- Assumed office 1 November 2021
- Nominated by: Halimah Yacob

Judicial Commissioner of the Supreme Court
- In office 4 January 2021 – 31 October 2021
- Nominated by: Halimah Yacob

Personal details
- Born: Philip Antony Jeyaretnam; 1964 (age 61–62) Singapore
- Spouse: Cindy Sim (m. 1988; div. 2013)
- Parent(s): J. B. Jeyaretnam (father); Margaret Cynthia Walker (mother)
- Relatives: Kenneth Jeyaretnam (brother); Harold Walker (uncle)
- Education: Raeburn Park School; United World College of South East Asia
- Alma mater: Corpus Christi College, Cambridge
- Occupation: Judge; lawyer; author
- Awards: Young Artist Award (1993); South-East Asian Write Award (2003)

Philip Antony Jeyaretnam (Note: Tamil: பிலிப் ஆண்டனி ஜெயரத்தினம், romanized: Pilip Āṇṭaṉi Jeyarattiṉam) SC BBM (born 1964) is a Singaporean judge, lawyer and author. He has been serving as a Judge of the High Court of Singapore since 1 November 2021, having first been appointed to the Bench as a Judicial Commissioner on 4 January 2021. He has also served as President of the Singapore International Commercial Court (SICC) since 2 January 2023. Prior to his appointment to the Bench, he served as Dentons' ASEAN chief executive officer and global vice-chair. He also served as president of the Law Society of Singapore between 2004 and 2007. Jeyaretnam was also one of the youngest lawyers to be appointed Senior Counsel in 2003 at the age of 38.

== Early life ==
Born in Singapore, Jeyaretnam is the younger son of Joshua Benjamin Jeyaretnam, the first opposition politician to be elected to Parliament in post-independence Singapore, and Margaret Walker. He is of Sri Lankan Tamil and English descent. Growing up, he was "inspired by both [his] parents who were lawyers". He found his father's court work "exciting" due to "the probing, the cut and thrust, the interplay between two opponents" which "appealed to [his] competitive streak". Jeyaretnam also said that his "best days are spent right in the thrust of battle in court" where he gets to "uncover things, to get to the truth". His older brother, Kenneth Jeyaretnam, was the leader of the opposition Reform Party (RP), which was founded by their father shortly before his death in 2008.

Jeyaretnam received his early education at Raeburn Park School and the United World College of South East Asia in Singapore, and at the Charterhouse School in Surrey, England. He then went on to Corpus Christi College, Cambridge, where he read law and graduated with first class honours in 1986. He was admitted to the Singapore Bar in 1987 and was conferred the title of Senior Counsel in 2003, when he was only 38.

== Career ==
On 1 January 2011, Jeyaretnam was appointed as managing partner of Rodyk & Davidson, one of Singapore's leading law firms. In 2016, he led the firm's combination with Dentons, forming Dentons Rodyk & Davidson LLP. He held the positions of Singapore chief executive officer and global vice-chair at Dentons. Jeyaretnam is recognised as an expert in arbitration, construction law and litigation in major legal publications. Described by Legal500 as a 'star' and 'master tactician' in 2014, Jeyaretnam's recent and significant cases include representing The Wall Street Journal on issues arising from its coverage of the 1MDB affair and defending the Papua New Guinea Sustainable Development Programme against a suit by the Government of Papua New Guinea.

Jeyaretnam received the C.C. Tan Award from the Law Society of Singapore in December 2020. This annual award is given to those who best exemplify the Bar's traditions of integrity, fairness and gentlemanly conduct.

On 4 January 2021, Jeyaretnam was appointed as a judicial commissioner of the Supreme Court of Singapore. He was appointed as a Judge on 1 November 2021 and is currently President of the Singapore International Commercial Court. He is also concurrently a member of the Judicial Service Commission and the Presidential Council for Minority Rights.

== Boards and memberships ==
Jeyaretnam served an 11-year term as a member of the Public Service Commission and currently serves as a member of the Presidential Council for Minority Rights. He served as the Chairman of Maxwell Chambers from 2010 to 2020, for which public service he received the Public Service Star in 2021. Prior to becoming a judge, he was a member of the SIAC Regional Panel of Arbitrators. In July 2005, Jeyaretnam was appointed as a board member of the Singapore National Kidney Foundation by the Minister for Health to help restore proper governance and public trust. He is a former president of the Law Society of Singapore, and was Founding Chairman of the Society of Construction Law from 2002 to 2004.

Jeyaretnam used to chair the board of trustees for the nonprofit arts group the Practice Performing Arts School founded by Kuo Pao Kun. In his view, the arts are as important as any other elements in the growth of a society. Writers, artists, composers, directors – whom he terms "ideas people" – are needed for a lively arts scene and that more should be done to encourage new ideas from artists. He also called for greater support from the private sector for "the serious arts", since the popular arts are commonly "funded by the market and community organisations".

== Personal life ==
Jeyaretnam is the son of J. B. Jeyaretnam, a prominent opposition politician in Singapore who often clashed with leaders of the governing People's Action Party (PAP). His older brother, Kenneth Jeyaretnam, was the secretary-general of the opposition Reform Party from 2009 until his death in 2026.

Jeyaretnam married actress Cindy Sim, an ethnic Chinese, in 1988 and they have three children together, Quentin, Tristan and Miranda. They divorced in 2013.

== Works ==
Jeyaretnam's collection of short stories, First Loves, published in Singapore in 1987, claimed record sales on Singapore's Sunday Times best-seller book list. It won him the compliment as Singapore's "home-grown Maugham". First Loves and his debut novel Raffles Place Ragtime (1988) were both nominated for the Commonwealth Writers Prize (South-east Asia and the South Pacific). His second novel, Abraham's Promise (1995) won a highly commended book award from the National Book Development Council of Singapore. He was presented with the 'Young Artist of the Year' award in 1993, the Montblanc-NUS Centre for the Arts Literary Award in 1997, and a S.E.A. Write Award in 2003.

In 1990, he was a Fulbright Fellowship visitor to the University of Iowa International Writing Program and to the Harvard Law School. He was also an adjunct professor with the Department of Building at the National University of Singapore from 2005 to 2013.

In 2015, Abraham's Promise was selected by The Business Times as one of the Top 10 English Singapore books from 1965 to 2015, alongside titles by Arthur Yap and Daren Shiau.

=== Novels ===
- Raffles Place Ragtime (1988, Times Books International; 2010, Marshall Cavendish Editions) ISBN 9971655004 ISBN 9789814302463
- Abraham's Promise (1995, Times Books International; 2010, Marshall Cavendish Editions) ISBN 9789812045157 ISBN 9789814302685
- Tigers in Paradise: The Collected Works of Philip Jeyaretnam (2004, Times Editions) ISBN 9812327924

=== Short stories ===
- Campfire (1983, second-prize winner of the National Short Story Competition)
- Evening Under Frangipani (1985, winner of the National Short Story Competition)
- First Loves (1987, Times Books International; 2009, Marshall Cavendish Editions) ISBN 9971654172 ISBN 9789812618979
- Strangler Fig (2014, collected in Singapore Noir)
- Moonshine in Singapore (2015, collected in Singathology)

=== Anthologies ===
- Sui, Gwee Li (2016). Written Country: The History of Singapore through Literature. Landmark Books Pte Ltd. ISBN 978-981-4189-66-8.

=== Articles (professional) ===
- Co-author, "Injunctions and Interim Relief", Civil Litigation in Singapore (Sweet & Maxwell, 2016)
- Jeyaretnam, Philip; Lau, Wen Jin (2016). "The Granting Of Mareva Injunctions In Support Of Foreign Court Proceedings". Singapore Academy of Law Journal. 28: 503–526.
- Ramesh, Kannan; Tan, Chuan Thye, eds. (2015). "The Presentation of Expert Evidence at Trial". Law and practice of commercial litigation in Singapore. Singapore. ISBN 978-981-09-5782-7. OCLC 931659038.
- Author, "Indonesia Changes Course in Investor Protection", The Business Times, 26 June 2014 (Singapore: Singapore Press Holdings, 2014)
- Author, "Myanmar and the New York Convention: Not Just A Piece Of Paper", The Business Times, 28 May 2014 (Singapore: Singapore Press Holdings, 2014)
- Author, "S'pore's Role in Int'l Arbitration in Asia", The Business Times, 20 May 2014 (Singapore: Singapore Press Holdings, 2014)
- Building and Construction Law, Singapore Academy of Law Annual Reviews (vols. 2000 – 2004; co-author)

=== Articles (non-professional) ===
- Inheritance (1991) – English-written essay, subsequently translated into German in 1993.
- Raffles Place Reviewed (2016, The Straits Times)
- Light Among The Shadows (2016, The Business Times Lifestyle)
