= Hanyang University =

South Korean private university

- 한양대학교
- Motto: 사랑의 실천
- Motto in English: Love in Deed and Truth
- Type: Private research university
- Established: 1939; 87 years ago
- Founder: Kim Lyun-joon
- President: Lee Ki-jeong
- Undergraduates: 25,155
- Postgraduates: 9,506
- Location: Seoul, South Korea
- Campus: Seoul Campus (Seongdong District, Seoul, South Korea) ERICA Campus (Sangnok District, Ansan, [[Gyeonggi-do]], South Korea)
- Colors: Blue; Gray
- Nickname: Lions
- Website: www.hanyang.ac.kr

Korean name
- Hangul: 한양대학교
- Hanja: 漢陽大學校
- RR: Hanyang daehakgyo
- MR: Hanyang taehakkyo

Hanyang University (HYU, Korean: 한양대학교) is a private research university in Seoul and Ansan (ERICA campus), South Korea. Hanyang (한양; 漢陽) derives from the former name of the capital Seoul used during the Joseon period. The university was founded in 1939 as an engineering school, and was the country's first private college to offer engineering and architecture programs.

The university enrolls over 3,000 international students each year, and sends more than 3,300 students on study abroad programs annually. As of 2018, Hanyang University had 777 partner universities in 76 countries.

== History ==
Hanyang University was founded as Dong-A Engineering Institute on July 1, 1939, during the Japanese occupation of Korea. Dong-A Institute started with 630 students and 35 faculty in Jongno District, Seoul. After producing its first graduates in 1941, Dong-A tried to elevate itself to college status, to no avail. In May 1941, the Institute relocated and offered education specializing in engineering and technology to 100 students who had finished secondary school. In 1943, with Korea still under Japanese occupation, the institute was suspended from recruiting new students. This resulted in a temporary shutdown of the school on March 15, 1944, when the last 78 students graduated.

Upon the restoration of the nation's independence in August 1945, Dong-A Institute renamed itself the Engineering Institute for National Foundation. Institute founder Dr. Kim Lyun-joon foresaw the importance of industrial advancement in the reconstruction of Korea and established Hanyang University as a judicial and academic body. The board of trustees at that time included Myowook Lee, Byeongok Cho, Kwansoo Baik, Wonchul Lee, Waljoon Kim, Taeyong Choi, and Lyunjoon Kim, who had led the nation's independence movement. In July 1948, the school was accredited as the first four-year engineering college in Korea with Kim Lyun-joon as the first dean. Six engineering sub-departments were set up, as well as a secondary school.

During the Korean War, many of the school's facilities were destroyed and the professors and students were scattered. However, classes were continued in Busan with temporary teachers. Even during their refuge, the college fostered numerous competent science teachers by building a training center for secondary school teachers in the technical fields. In 1953, Hanyang University was authorized as a graduate school by the Ministry of Education.

== Campuses ==
=== Seoul ===
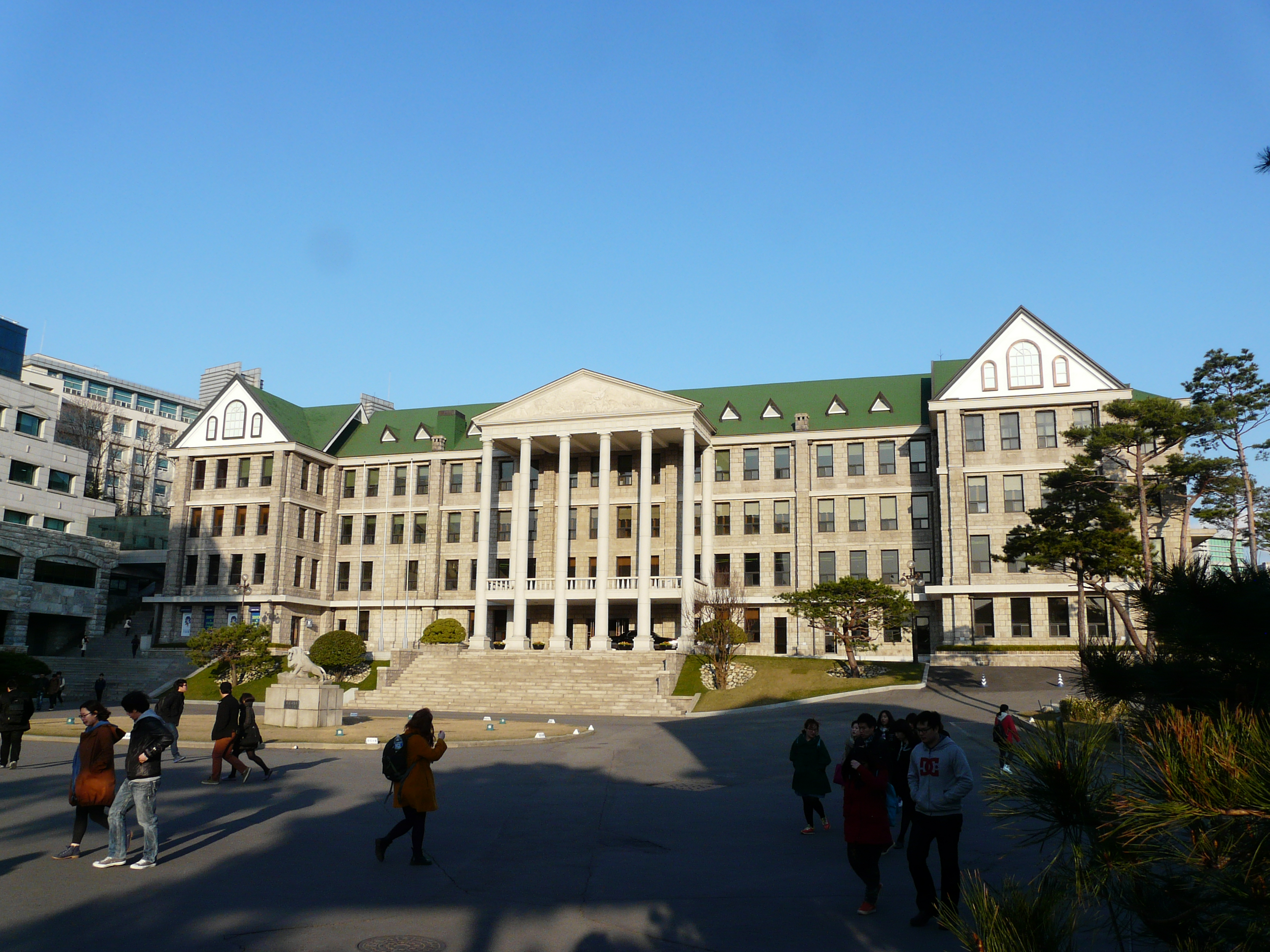
Hanyang University Seoul, 2013

The Seoul campus is home to 15 colleges and 60 departments. It comprises a variety of research centers, which are based on distinct academic fields. The Seoul campus has more than 60 buildings, including those of Hanyang Women's University and Hanyang Cyber University. In 2009, a new administration building was completed to commemorate HYU's 70th anniversary. The Center for Students with Disabilities was also built the same year. The campus also has a number of auxiliary facilities, which are unconnected to but affiliated with the university. There is Infonopia Hanyang (백남학술정보관), which has a collection of 1.5 million books, 12,500 serial publications, 83,000 electronic journals, and 50 academic databases.

=== ERICA ===
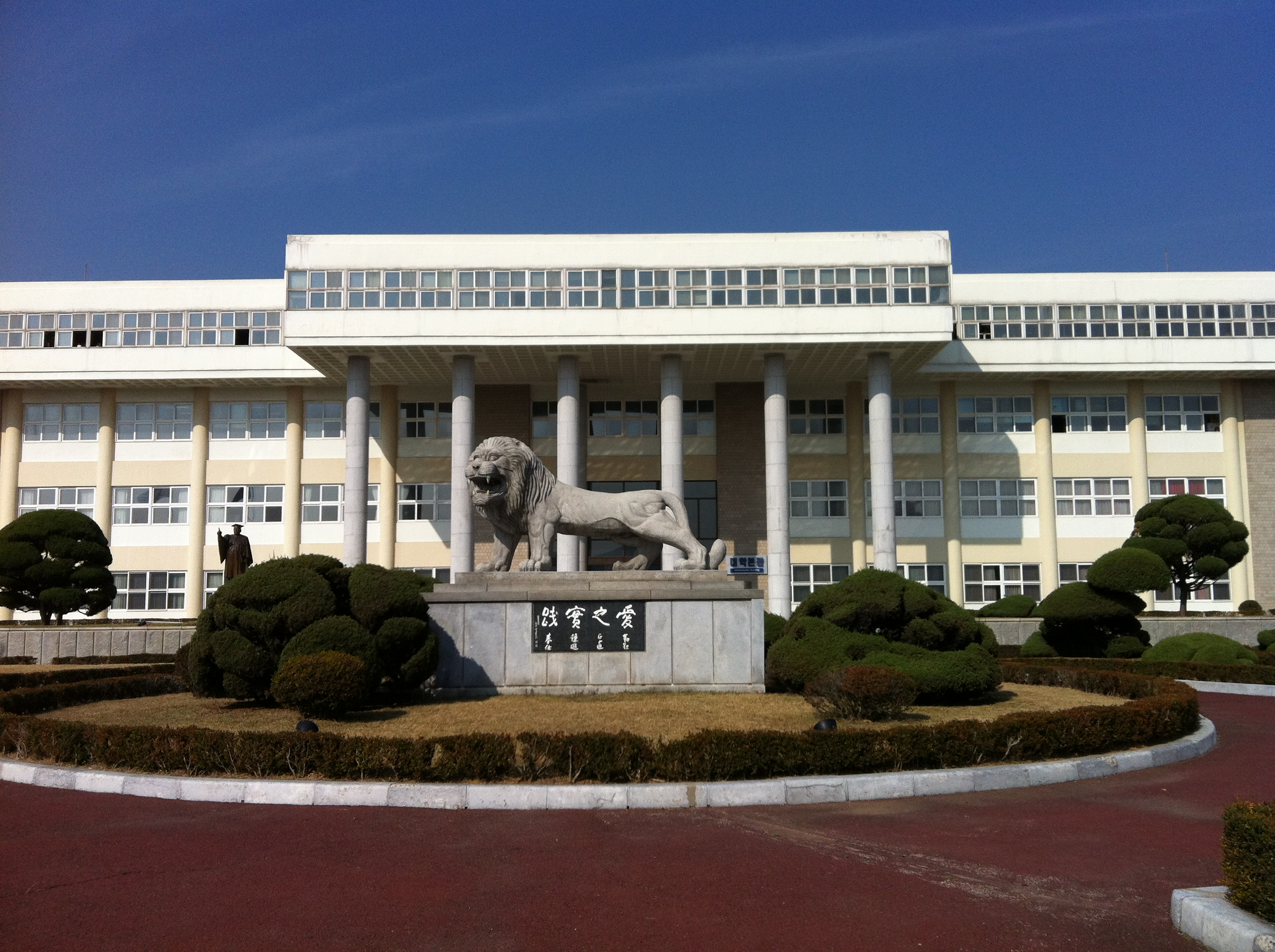
Hanyang ERICA Administrative Building

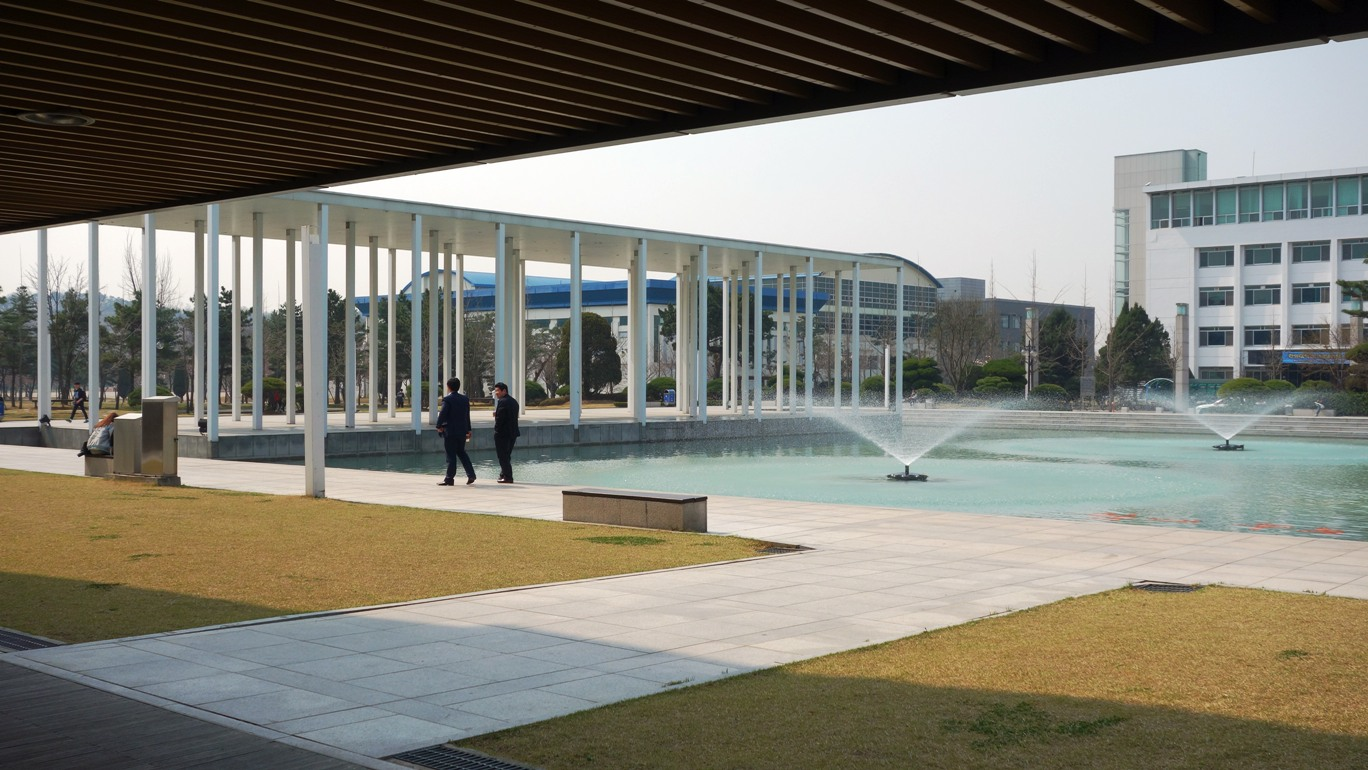
Lions Lake at ERICA campus, Ansan

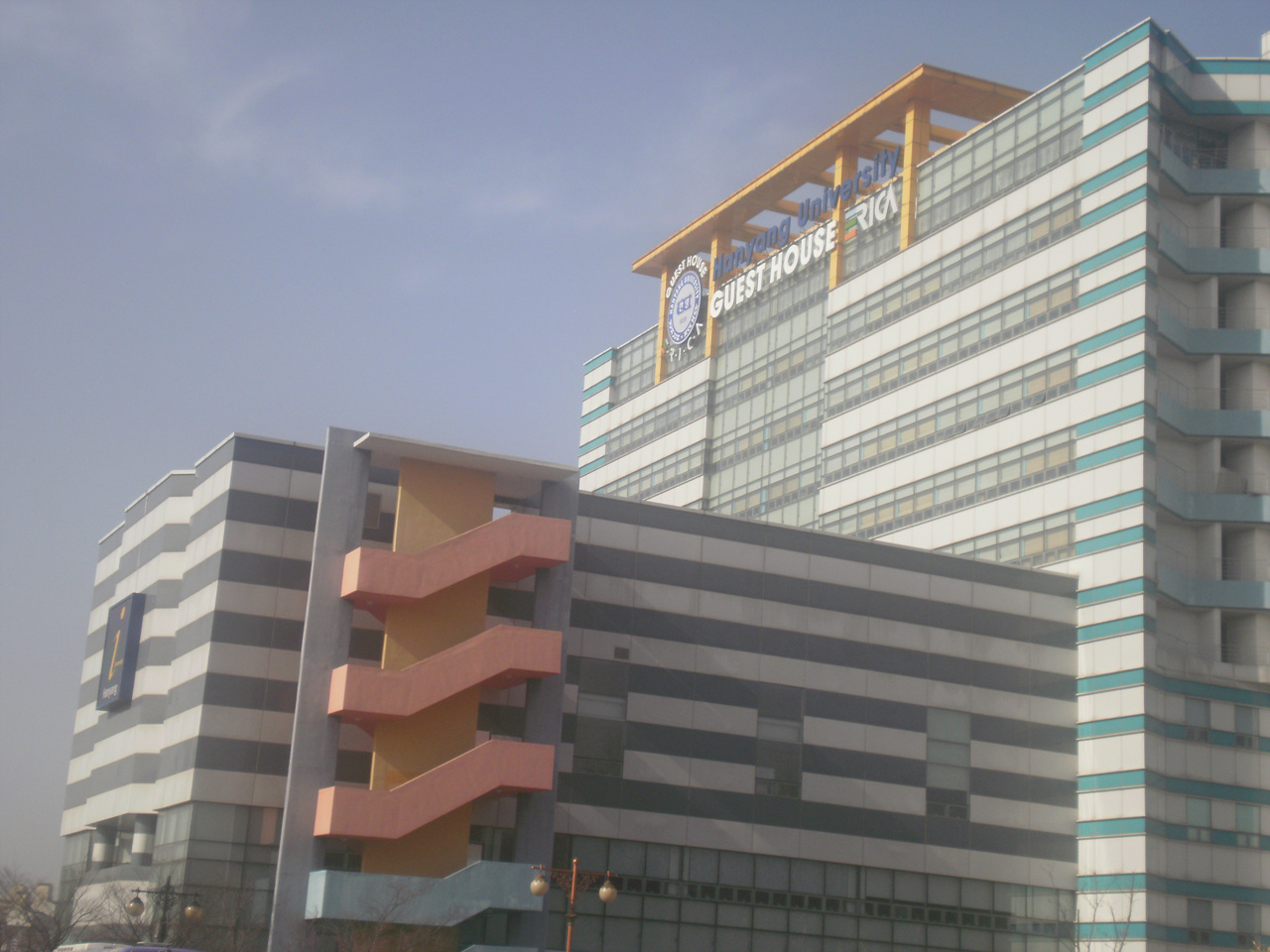
ERICA Guest House

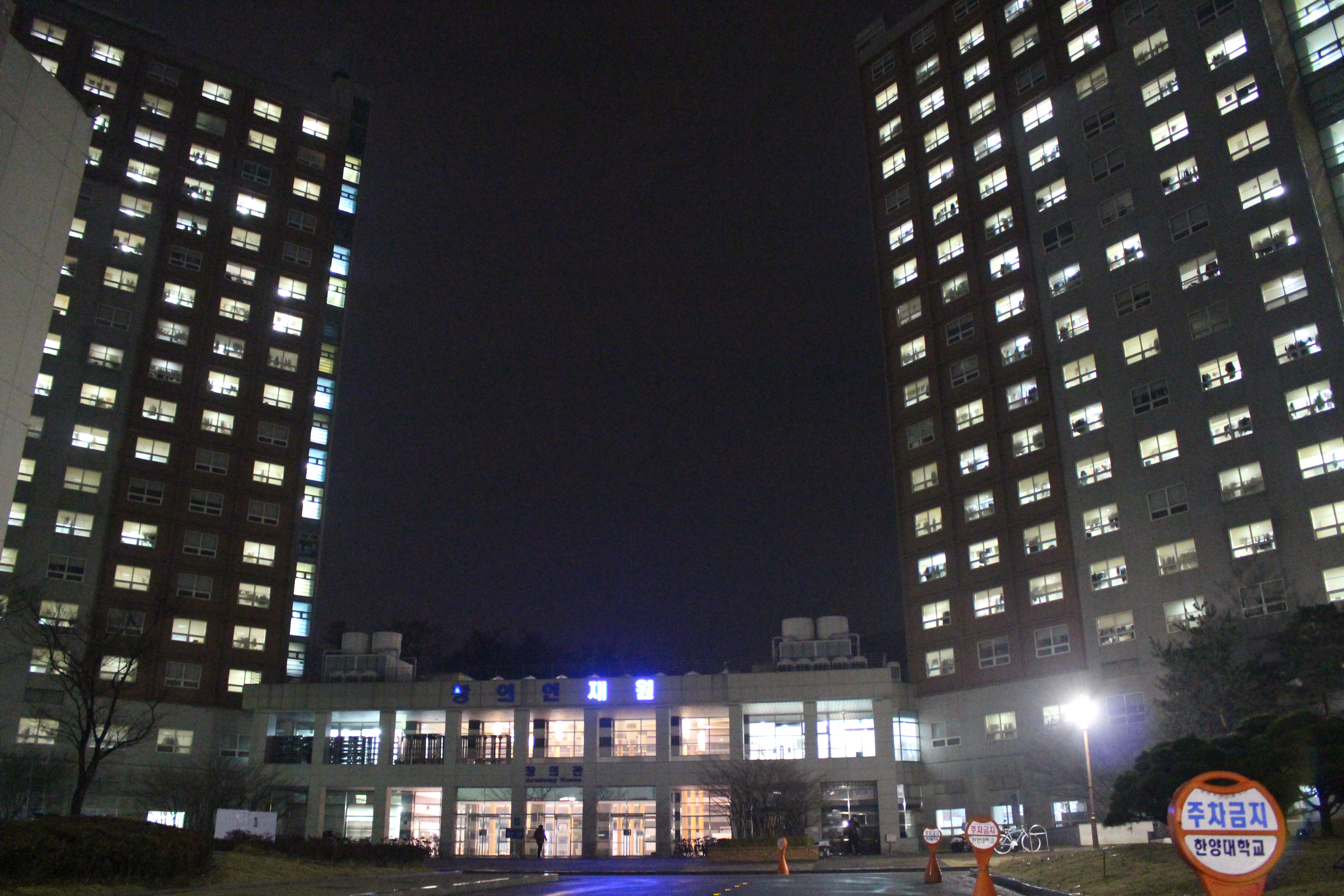
ERICA Domestic/International Dormitory

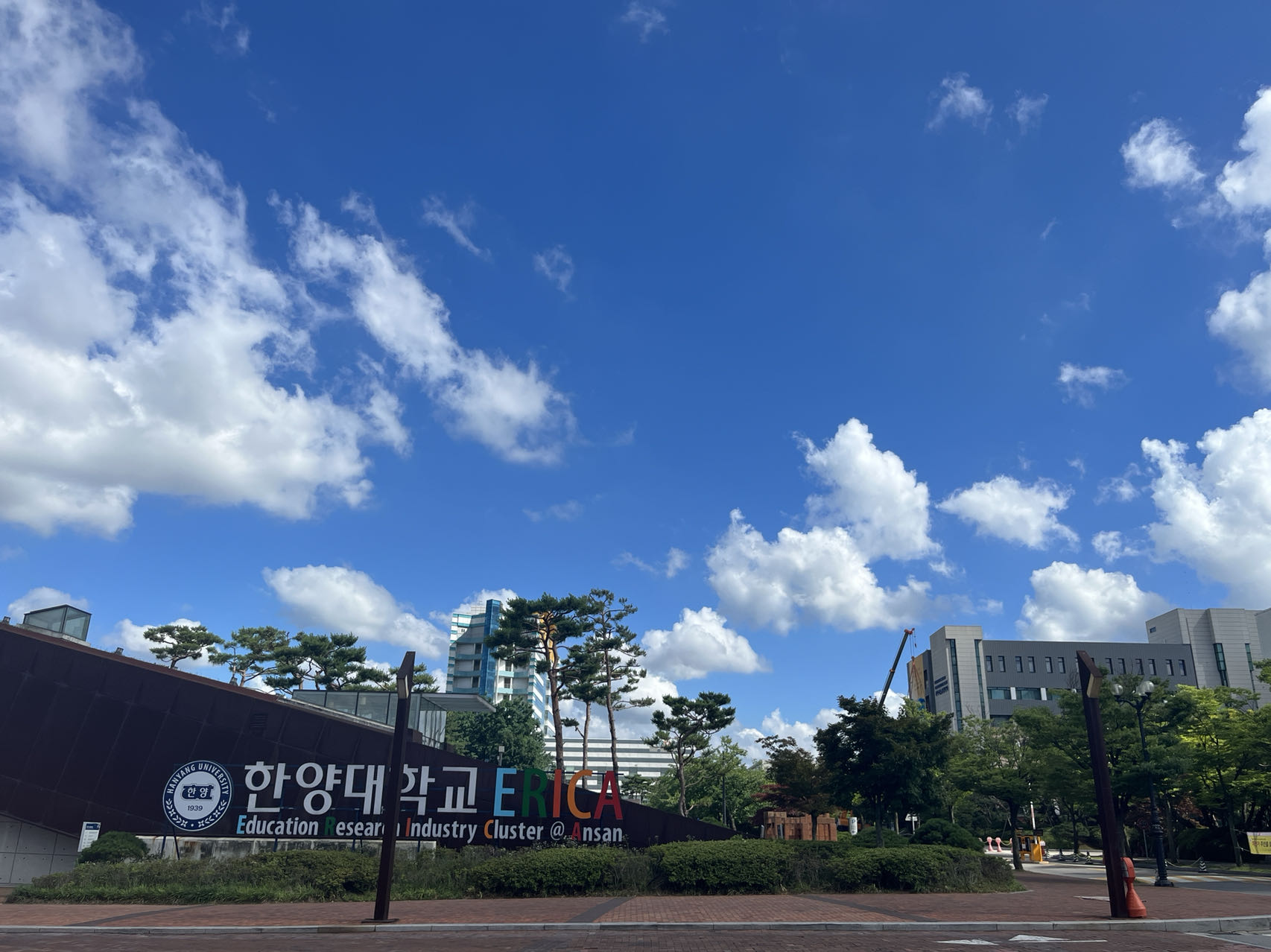
Erica campus main gate

The campus was renamed from Ansan Campus to ERICA Campus in 2009.

The ERICA (Education Research Industry Cluster at Ansan) campus is located in Ansan, Gyeonggi Province, approximately 40 km south of Seoul. In 2009, the ERICA campus of Hanyang University was designated as a government-supported public bicycle pilot school and received donations of infrastructure and bicycles, including public bicycle systems and storage stations. Since 2022, there are not public bicycle storage stations. ERICA Campus is home to 9 colleges and 42 departments. The ERICA Campus is known for a program known as the Education Research Industry Cluster Program, which is intended to develop vocational skills. The ERICA Campus has three on-campus dormitories and four operational school cafeterias. It has a lake park which has fountains. It also has an ecological park. Students at the ERICA Campus mainly used Seoul Subway Line 4, but the Shinansan Line is expected to open soon. Although it was originally scheduled to open in April 2025, Delays in land compensation and permits, as well as issues related to accidents and supply disruptions, are increasing the likelihood that the opening will be pushed to after 2030.

=== Graduate Schools ===
The graduate programs of Hanyang University are divided into three schools: the General Graduate School, Professional Graduate School, and Special Graduate School. Professional Graduate Schools focus more on vocational skills, while Special Graduate Schools focuses on research related to fieldwork. The General Graduate School offers 87 Master's programs and 85 doctoral programs.

== Programs ==
Seoul campus

The Seoul campus of HYU offers undergraduate programs in:

- Engineering
- Architecture / Architecture Design
- Computer Science
- Automotive Engineering
- Medicine
- Humanities
- Social Sciences
- Natural Sciences
- Policy Sciences
- Economics & Finance
- Business
- Education
- Human Ecology
- Music
- Performing Arts & Sports
- International Studies
- Nursing
- Industrial Convergence

ERICA campus

The ERICA campus in Ansan offers undergraduate programs in:

- Engineering Sciences
- Pharmacy
- Science & Convergence Technology
- Languages & Cultures
- Communication & Social Sciences
- Computing
- Business & Economics
- Design
- Sports & Arts
- Marketing

Graduate school

The HYU Graduate School offers graduate programs in:

- Graduate School
- Urban Studies
- International Studies
- Global Business
- School of Medicine
- School of Law
- Biomedical Science & Engineering
- Technology & Innovation Management
- Engineering
- Public Policy
- Education
- Journalism & Mass Communication
- International Tourism
- Information and Clinical Nursing
- Innovation
- Business Management

International programs

First introduced in 2016, the G2 (English-Chinese) Language Education Program obligates the completion of an English and Chinese course and has an official grade of both languages as a mandatory requirement.

== Research and development ==
Hanyang University maintains active research programs in biological sciences, natural sciences, medicine, natural resources and environment, media and communication, and business administration. Hanyang has designated "Outreaching Research Competitiveness" as one of its key strategic directions under the NEW HANYANG 2020 plan. For its part, the Industry-University Cooperation Foundation (IUCF) is working to promote more individual and collaborative research at HYU by providing funding for research projects from their initial stage, and offering assistance in the publication of research papers in prominent international journals, among other duties.

=== Key research accomplishments ===
HYU's reputation for research has resulted in following key accomplishments:

- Hanyang is currently operating the Components and Materials R&D Cluster of international standards at the ERICA Campus. Resident government research institutes in this designated "Cluster Zone" include KITECH, KTL, and KERI. Research centers for such private companies as LG Innotek and LG Micron also have a presence there.
- In 2006, 28 project teams from Hanyang were selected for Brain Korea (BK21) Phase II project, which is the second stage of the Korean government-sponsored program that seeks to develop and promote world-class research universities. HYU enjoyed particular success in the field of science and technology, with all project teams that applied being selected for the program. Over the next seven years, HYU will receive 15.4 billion won a year in government funding for BK21 research.
- Hanyang currently ranks number one among Korean universities in technology transfer revenues, earning more than 10 billion won between 2006 and 2009. Moreover, the HYU Center for Business Incubation is consistently recognized for its standard of excellence each year by the Ministry of Information and Communication. In addition to the domestic market, the center has also made inroads into China by establishing a local presence in Shanghai. Furthermore, HYU is the only Korean university to earn the highest rating for five consecutive years in the university led TLO (Technology Licensing Office) program supported by the Ministry of Education, Science, and Technology. Most recently, the Center transferred the pico porous polymer membrane technology to a global enterprise.
- Hanyang is operating the Cell Therapy Center for Intractable Neurological Disorders. At the center, they are providing therapy for the patients and conducting research to find cures for Lou Gehrig's disease, which is said to be the first in the world that is closest to being approved by the Korean FDA.
- As the hub of engineering and research, Hanyang has research centers around the campus. At the Innovation Center for Engineering Education in Hanyang University Seoul campus, researchers are conducting research on bipedal robots to improve its efficiency. They are making robots, which resemble humans. Through precise programming and control, they are simulating every movement of humans and succeeded in letting the robots change directions efficiently while walking, mimicking how humans change directions in real life. The main focus of their research is using a process called slip foot, which means that when changing directions, one of the robot's feet 'slips' on the ground when its body rotates to the desired direction. Once it gets fully developed, the researchers predict that the human-like robots could also be used in households, as seen in many sci-fi movies.
- Research teams at Hanyang are also making progress in their research on silicon and germanium. The team previously discovered that the proper alternative for this may be a Si-GE (germanium) composite. It benefits both the mechanics and kinetics associated with lithium while maintaining its high specific capacity, especially volumetric capacity. It has recently been explored as an anode material for lithium-ion batteries due to its stable cycle performance, and excellent rate capability. The team studied both the Si-Ge and Ge-Si core-shell nanowires and figured out the nanowires that have a Si core and a Ge shell demonstrates a much improved electrochemical performance, especially cycle performance and rate capability.
- In the biomedical field, researchers are making strides in the methods to cure malaria, a mosquito-borne infectious disease caused by parasitic protozoans of the genus Plasmodium. They are annotating the Pf3D7 strain, which is a specific strain of the Pf species. The recent completion of the genome sequence of Pf offers new opportunities to identify more effective targets for drug development and to gain insight into the biological pathways involved in malaria pathogenesis.
- Researchers in the field of Chemistry are also developing photo-responsive polymers, transparency, and high heat resistant polymers for flexible displays, biodegradable polymers, and new functional polymers. Researchers report on a new acrylamide-based hard-soft hybrid BCP that can generate high-quality lithographic patterns satisfying all six criteria mentioned above. It has additional potential as a scaffold for metallic nanostructures. PDOPAM-PMMA BCPs were synthesized from newly designed crystalline p-dodecylphenylacrylamide (DOPAM) and methyl methacrylate monomers via RAFT polymerization. The findings of his study suggest that the newly developed BCPs can be a universal and practical candidate for the implementation of sub-20 nm directed self-assembly processes. With the fruits of their research, the team's research was selected as one of the top 5 percent of papers of Advanced Material.
- ERICA was selected as a university for the first Campus Innovation Park project by the Ministry of Education, the Ministry of Land, Infrastructure and Transport, and the Ministry of SMEs and Startups in 2019 and was promised 690 billion won. Currently, Korea's IT company Kakao's data center and the U.S. supplier Entegris' technology center are located on campus.

== Reputation ==
University rankings
JoongAng National	Domestic	3; 13 (ERICA)
QS National	General	6
THE National	General	8–10
ARWU National	Research	4–6
QS Asia (Asia version)	General	20
THE Asia (Asia version)	General	=43
USNWR Asia	General	=107
ARWU World	Research	201–300
QS World	General	159
THE World	General	251–300
USNWR World	General	=434

=== Rankings ===
Joong-Ang Ilbo University Ranking

In 2016, Joongang Ilbo ranked Hanyang University's Seoul Campus 2nd and ERICA Campus 9th in the country.

In 2017, Joongang Ilbo ranked Hanyang University's Seoul Campus 3rd and ERICA Campus 9th in the country.

In 2018, Joongang Ilbo ranked Hanyang University's Seoul Campus 3rd and ERICA Campus 9th in the country.

Korea Economic Daily Engineering School Assessment

Hanyang University has been consistently ranked the #1 engineering school in the nation.

In 2016, Hanyang University Ranked First in 2016 Engineering School Assessment in the country.

In the "2016 Engineering School Assessment" conducted jointly by the Korea Economic Daily and Global Research, Hanyang University was ranked No. 1 with the total score of 299 points. Hanyang University won the highest score in an evaluation of the nation's 50 engineering schools, in terms of industry-university cooperation, technology commercialization, and start-up and job search support, as well as education and research quality. Runners-up included Sungkyunkwan University, KAIST, POSTECH, and Seoul National University.

QS World University Ranking

Hanyang University is ranked 162nd on the QS World University list in 2025.

The World's Most Innovative Universities by Reuters

Hanyang has been named among the world's top 100 most innovative universities by Reuters. The ranking was determined by the composite score of several metrics that were focused on academic papers and patent filings. Reuters ranked Hanyang 5th among Korean universities and 62nd globally in 2015.

== Notable alumni ==
=== Public Sector ===
- Hong Nam-ki, Minister of Economy and Finance & Deputy Prime Minister of South Korea
- Borim Kim, Goldman Prize winner and environmental activist
- Choo Mi-ae, former Minister of Justice of South Korea
- Kim Moo-sung, South Korean politician
- Im Jong-seok, South Korean politician and former chief of staff
- Hong Ihk-pyo, South Korean academic and politician
- Kang Hui-yong, South Korean politician and professor
- Kim Byung-wook, South Korean politician
- Kim Jin-jae, South Korean politician
- Kim Ok-tu, South Korean politician
- Kim Hyun, South Korean politician

=== Business ===
- Chung Mong-koo, Honorary Chairman and former CEO of Hyundai Motor Group

=== Arts and literature ===
- Park Mok-wol, poet
- Pyun Hye-young, author
- Shin Dong-ok, poet

=== Sports ===
- Chang Chang-sun, freestyle wrestler, Olympic silver medalist and world champion
- Chung Min-tae, professional baseball player
- Jang Sung-ho, judoka and Olympic silver medalist
- Park Hang-seo, coach of the Vietnam national football team and Vietnam national under-23 football team
- Yang Dong-geun, former professional basketball player
- Yoon Dong-sik, MMA fighter and judoka
- Dae-sung Koo, former professional MLB baseball pitcher
- Park Chan-ho, former professional MLB baseball pitcher

=== Entertainment ===
- Bae Sung-jae, television personality and announcer
- Choi Bool-am, actor
- Choi Seung-cheol (Seventeen), rapper
- Choi Yeo Jin, actress
- Gang Dong-won, actor
- Ha Seok-jin, actor
- Hong Ji-yoon, actress
- Hong Kyung, actor
- Jang Dong-yoon, actor
- Jang Keun-suk, actor and singer
- Jang Yong, actor
- Jeon Soo-kyeong, actress
- Jeon Wonwoo (Seventeen), rapper
- Jeong Yu-mi, actress
- Ji Sung, actor
- Jo Hye-ryun, comedian
- Jung Da-bin, actress
- Jung Il-woo, actor
- Jung Jae-hyung, singer-songwriter
- Kang Ye-won, actress
- Kand Dong-won, actor
- Kim Hyang-gi, actress
- Kim Hye-jun, actress
- Kim Min-jung, actress
- Kim Shin-rok, actress
- Kim So-hyun, actress
- Kwon Soon-young (Seventeen), singer-choreographer
- Lee Byung-hun, actor
- Lee Chung-ah, actress
- Lee Da-in, actress
- Lee Hak-joo, actor
- Lee Ji-hoon (Seventeen), singer-songwriter and producer
- Lee Jung-eun, actress
- Lee Sang-yeob, actor
- Lee Young-ae, actress
- Lee Young-ah, actress
- Lee Mi-do, actress
- Lee Moon-sik, actor
- Lee Pil-mo, actor
- Park Ji-hu, actress
- Park Mi-sun, comedian and TV host
- Park Jung-yeon, actress
- Roh Jeong-eui, actress
- Sul Kyung-gu, actor
- Yoon Chan-young, actor
- Yoon Jeonghan (Seventeen), vocalist
- Yu Oh-seong, actor

== Disputes ==
During the 2019–20 Hong Kong protests, some students in Hanyang University showed their support for Hong Kong. On 14 November 2019, it was reported that a number of local students in Hanyang University and Korea University were attacked and beaten up by students from China. The posters prepared by the Korean students were also destroyed. The dispute extended to the internet. Some Korean students asked those students to go back to China if they were so patriotic.

== See also ==
- SPACEMAP
