= Alastair George MacKenzie =

Alastair George MacKenzie CBE MC (1915–1989) was an important figure in South East Asian insurance during the 1960s and 1970s, head of the Commercial Union Assurance Company in the region, President of Singapore Rugby Union (1956–58), President of Malayan Rugby Union (1960–61) and a Council Member of the British Association of Singapore (1957–66). He was awarded the Military Cross in 1946 for valour shown in the service of the Royal Malay Regiment at the fall of Singapore in 1942 and was made CBE in 1967 for services to insurance.

== Life ==
Alastair George MacKenzie was born on 31 October 1915. He was educated at Bedford Modern School and Northampton School.

MacKenzie emigrated to the Malaya in 1938 where he joined the Commercial Union Assurance Company. During World War II he served as a subaltern with the carrier platoon of the 1st Battalion of the Royal Malay Regiment during the final days of the defence of Singapore in February 1942. An account of his experience is held at the Imperial War Museum, 'emphasising the unit's determined resistance to the Japanese almost up to the time of the capitulation'. He was awarded the Military Cross. He continued his involvement with the Singapore Volunteer Corps achieving the rank of Major.

After the War, MacKenzie resumed his work in South East Asia with the Commercial Union Assurance Company. He was elected Chairman of the Motor Insurance Association of Malayan and Borneo, a position he held between 1955 and 1956. He was later head of the Commercial Union Assurance Company in South East Asia.

Outside of insurance, MacKenzie was President of Singapore Rugby Union (1956–58), President of Malayan Rugby Union (1960–61) and a Council Member of the British Association of Singapore (1957–66). He was Chairman of Tanglin School (1958–61) and Chairman of Raeburn Park School (1959–67).

MacKenzie was made CBE in 1967 for services to insurance.
