= Shin Dong-ok =

South Korean poet (born 1977)

Shin Dong-ok (Korean: 신동옥; born 1977) is a South Korean poet.

== Life ==
Shin Dong-ok was born in Goheung County, South Korea in 1977. He completed a PhD program in Korean literature at Hanyang University and is working as a lecturer. He made his literary debut in 2001 when he won a poetry contest run by the journal The Poetry and Anti-Poetry. His poetry collections include Akgong, Anakiseuteu gita (악공, 아나키스트 기타 Musician, Anarchist Guitar) (2008) and Utgo chumchugo yeoreumhara (웃고 춤추고 여름하라 Laugh, Dance, and Summer Away) (2012). In 2010, he received the 5th Yun Dongju Literature Award for Young Writers.

== Writing ==
Poet Kang Jeong has described Shin Dong-ok as a "poet who uses a strange new language yet makes it flow effortlessly." Shin's poetry is usually dark and somber in tone, exploring themes such as death, extinction, despair, and incest. It provides introspection on human lives through motifs like drawing, singing, dancing, and other sensory activities. Shin's first poetry collection, in which he adopts the persona of a musician, has been described by critic Yoo Jun as "having the echo of a string instrument. The echo represents solitude, pain, and the void." His second poetry collection Utgo chumchugo yeoreumhara (웃고 춤추고 여름하라 Laugh, Dance, and Summer Away) reveals the poet's desire to dance through language. He deconstructs the meaning and function of everyday language and attempts to create new meaning and poetic diction, which he does to expand perceptual horizons. In a commentary explaining why Shin was selected for the Nojak Literature Prize, poet Shin Yong-mok writes: "Above all, his pedantic and loquacious style has the power to make the reader glimpse a strange world hidden in between the lines. It is a curious phenomenon that occurs in the gap between matter and space, turmoil and silence."

== Works ==
Poetry Collections

1. 『악공, 아나키스트 기타』(랜덤하우스코리아, 2008)

Musician, Anarchist Guitar. Random House Korea, 2008.

2. 『웃고 춤추고 여름하라』(문학동네, 2012)

Laugh, Dance, and Summer Away. Munhakdongne, 2012.

3. 『고래가 되는 꿈』(문예중앙, 2016)

Dream of Turning into a Whale. Munye Joongang, 2016.

Essay Collections

1. 『서정적 게으름』(서랍의 날씨, 2015)

Lyrical Laziness. Seorabui Nalssi, 2015.

== Awards ==
- 2010: 5th Yun Dongju Literature Award for Young Writers
- 2016: 16th Nojak Literature Prize
