= Kim Jong =

Kim Jong (김정, also romanized Gim Jeong or Kim Jung in South Korea) may refer to:

- Kim Jong (金晸), birth name of Heongang of Silla (c. 861–886)
- Kim Jong (table tennis) (born 1999), North Korean Olympic athlete
- Kim Jong (sports management) (born 1961), South Korean Vice Minister of Culture and Sports during the Park Tae-hwan doping scandal

== See also ==
- - Kim Jong Il (1941–2011), second leader of North Korea
  - Kim Jong Un (born 1983 or 1984), third leader of North Korea and son of Kim Jong Il
- Kim (Korean surname)
- Jung (Korean given name)
