= Jeonghan X Wonwoo =

South Korean musical duo

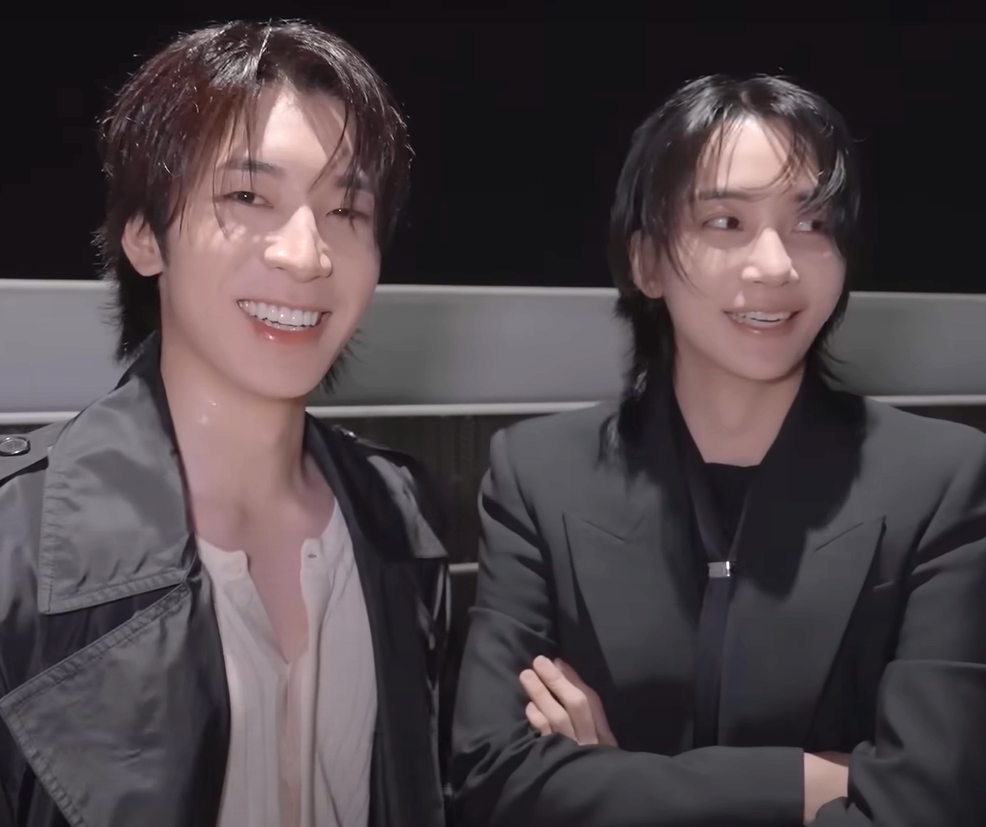
- Wonwoo and Jeonghan in 2024

Background information
- Also known as: JxW
- Origin: Seoul, South Korea
- Genre: K-pop
- Years active: 2024
- Label: Pledis
- Spinoff of: Seventeen
- Members: Jeonghan; Wonwoo

Jeonghan X Wonwoo (Korean: 정한 X 원우; also known as JxW) is the second sub-unit of South Korean boy band Seventeen, after BSS. Formed by Pledis Entertainment in 2024, the duo is composed of members Jeonghan and Wonwoo. JxW debuted on June 17, 2024, with the single album This Man.

== History ==
In December 2023, Jeonghan and Wonwoo were together featured in the 17th installment of Dispatch Korea's Dicon series with a pictorial and photobook titled Just Two of Us. The pictorial was photographed by Less.

On May 19, 2024, Pledis Entertainment revealed that Jeonghan and Wonwoo would form Seventeen's second sub-unit. On the same day, it was announced that the unit would release their first single album in June. On June 17, the duo released their debut single album This Man, which contained three tracks, including the single "Last Night". The album surpassed more than 530,000 copies on the first day of its release. By the end of the first week, the album extended the record, totaling to 787,046 copies sold.

The pair were featured on the cover of Allure Korea's June issue. At Seventeen's 8th Fan Meeting in July 2024, the pair performed "Last Night".

In September 2024, Jeonghan began his compulsory service in the South Korean military, halting his work in Seventeen and JxW while enlisted. He was followed by Wonwoo in March 2025.

== Discography ==
=== Single albums ===
List of single albums, showing selected details, selected chart positions, sales figures, and certifications
Title	Details	Peak chart positions			Sales	Certifications
Title	Details	KOR	JPN	JPN Comb.	Sales	Certifications
This Man	Released: June 17, 2024; Label: Pledis; Formats: CD, digital download, streaming	3	2	2	KOR: 966,546	KMCA: 2× Platinum; KMCA: Platinum (Wev.); RIAJ : Gold

=== Singles ===
List of singles, showing year released, selected chart positions, and name of the album
Title	Year	Peak chart position		Album
Title	Year	KOR	JPN Hot	Album
"Last Night"	2024	25	3	This Man

=== Other charted songs ===
List of singles, showing year released, selected chart positions, and name of the album
Title	Year	Peak chart position	Album
Title	Year	KOR	Album
"Leftover" (Wonwoo solo)	2024	74	This Man
"Beautiful Monster" (Jeonghan solo)	2024	— (Note: "Beautiful Monster" did not enter the Circle Digital Chart, but peaked at number 16 on the component Download Chart.)	This Man

== Videography ==
=== Music videos ===
Title	Year	Director(s)	Ref.
"Last Night"	2024	Hobin	

== Live performances ==
=== Other live performances ===
Date	Event	Performed song(s)	Ref.
June 20, 2024	Genius Open Mic	"Last Night"	
July 8, 2024	The First Take	"Last Night" (Acoustic Ver.)	

=== TV performances ===
Date	Event	City	Country	Performed song(s)	Ref.
June 20, 2024	M Countdown	Seoul	South Korea	"Last Night"	

== Awards and nominations ==
Name of the award ceremony, year presented, category, nominee of the award, and the result of the nomination
Award ceremony	Year	Category	Nominee / Work	Result	Ref.
Seoul Music Awards	2025	Main Prize (Bonsang)	JxW	Nominated	
Seoul Music Awards	2025	Popularity Award	JxW	Nominated	
Seoul Music Awards	2025	K-Wave Special Award	JxW	Nominated	
Seoul Music Awards	2025	K-pop World Choice – Group	JxW	Nominated	
