= Seventeen TV =

- Starring: Seventeen and other Pledis Entertainment trainees
- Country of origin: South Korea
- Original language: Korean
- No. of seasons: 5

Production
- Production location: South Korea
- Production company: Pledis Entertainment

Original release
- Network: Ustream
- Release: December 24, 2012

Related
- Hoshi and Seungkwan's Andromeda Seventeen Project: Debut Big Plan

Seventeen TV is a pre-debut online program featuring the South Korean boy group Seventeen before their official debut under Pledis Entertainment. The program was livestreamed through Ustream and showed the trainees' practice process and other pre-debut activities. Pledis also released promotional teasers and selected video content for the program through YouTube. The program was accompanied by a series of concerts titled Like Seventeen.

== Background ==
In April 2012, Pledis Entertainment announced that it was preparing a large boy group tentatively named Seventeen. The company initially planned for the group to consist of 17 members with an average age of 17 and aimed for it to debut by the end of that year. Pledis founder Han Sung-soo stated that the group had been planned for simultaneous activities in South Korea, China and Japan. Under the original concept, the full group would debut together before dividing into three units intended for activities in the three countries. The proposed lineup was also expected to include Chinese members as part of the company's localization strategy. Pledis described the planned musical concept as “Asia Pop”, which would combine K-pop with elements intended to appeal across the three markets.

The group's planned debut was later postponed to 2013. On December 17, 2012, Pledis began releasing promotional teasers titled Seventeen TV through its official YouTube channel. The company stated that the programme would publicly document the process of creating the group, including the trainees' training, preparations for debut and daily lives. The trainees were shown through CCTV-style broadcasts livestreamed on Ustream, while promotional teasers and selected content were uploaded to YouTube.

The trainees appearing on Seventeen TV were presented as candidates for the group rather than confirmed members. Pledis stated that they would undergo continued training and various evaluations before the final lineup was selected. The company described Seventeen as a group that would be developed together with the public and said that viewers' responses to the trainees would be considered during the selection process.

By April 2015, Pledis was publicly introducing Seventeen as a 13-member group through the reality program Seventeen Project: Debut Big Plan. Contemporary reporting stated that the group had originally been intended to have 17 members but that the lineup had been reduced to 13 following the training process. Seungkwan later said that the pool of prospective members had at one point reached around 30 before the final 13 became official members. Trainees came and went from the project throughout the years, and beyond the final thirteen members of the group also included Jang Do-yoon, Samuel Kim and Kim Min Gue.

== Broadcast history ==
=== First season ===
Following the release of promotional teasers beginning in December 2012, the first regular season of Seventeen TV premiered through Ustream on January 7, 2013. Broadcast live on Wednesdays and Fridays at 7:00 p.m. KST, the program combined CCTV-style footage of the trainees' training process and daily activities with entertainment segments. Its first regular broadcast attracted more than 5,000 simultaneous viewers, and the program surpassed 30,000 cumulative viewers within its first two weeks.

At the beginning of the season, the trainees' real names and profiles were not revealed. They were instead identified by nicknames based on their clothing or personal items. Viewers voted for a weekly MVP, whose official profile was then released through Seventeen's social-media accounts. Mingyu was the first trainee to be officially introduced, on January 24, 2013.

S.Coups and Jang Do-yoon made appearances during the first season. Both returned in the second season as participants in the Finding Seventeen's Music Friends segment.

Member	Nickname
Mingyu	Mr. Wristband
Jun	Mr. Blue Earmuffs
Seungkwan	Mr. Mic
Woozi	Mr. Fluorescent Colored Sneakers
Wonwoo	Mr. Beanie
Hoshi	Mr. Dumbbell
Vernon	Mr. Headphones
Dino	Mr. Backpack
DK	Mr. Hat
Mingming	Mr. White Earmuffs
Samuel	Mr. Teeny's Dad

=== Second season ===
In the second season, the 11 members from the previous season continued, and 4 more were added: Seungcheol (S.Coups), Doyoon, Joshua, and Dongjin. This season, they began to prepare for the first Like Seventeen concert, and so were separated into teams that were differentiated by the color of the shirts they wore. Others took part in the performances, under the title of "Music Friends". They were fans chosen to partake in the concert.

Purple team	Blue team	Black team	Red team	Yellow team
DK	Hoshi	S.Coups	Samuel	Seungkwan
―	Vernon	Mingyu	Doyoon	Joshua
―	MingMing	Dongjin	Wonwoo	―
―	Dino	―	Jun	―
―	―	―	Woozi	―

=== Third season ===
Early in the third season, a new member, Jeonghan, joined. And after a while, Samuel left for undisclosed reasons. During this season, they participated in missions where the public voted for their favorite member via the official website, and the most voted would compose the "tracklist" for Like Seventeen 2.

Members who participated
S.Coups	Doyoon	Jeonghan	Joshua
Jun	Hoshi	Wonwoo	Woozi
Mingming	DK	Mingyu	Seungkwan
Vernon	Dino	Dongjin	Samuel

=== Fourth season ===
This season continued with the same format as previously, i.e., missions and wishes for the formation of *Like Seventeen 3*. No member joined or left during the fourth season.

Members who participated
S.Coups	Doyoon	Jeonghan	Joshua
Jun	Hoshi	Wonwoo	Woozi
MingMing	DK	Mingyu	Seungkwan
Vernon	Dino	Dongjin	―

=== Fifth season ===
During the hiatus of Seventeen TV, Dongjin, Doyoon and Mingming all left the lineup (without stated reasons, but possibly a "secret trial" elimination); following this, new member The8 was introduced. Unlike other seasons, the fifth season started with a show, in order to display the evolution of the members' skills during the time gap. With only 7 episodes, two of them recorded shows, Seventeen officially closes the TV with a greater interaction with the fans, because for one hour of live they chatted with fans via Ustream's chat.

This season also had votes for the Like Seventeen 4, but was not based on missions, but only in the name of music.

Members who participated
S.Coups	Jeonghan	Joshua	Jun
Hoshi	Wonwoo	Woozi	DK
Mingyu	The8	Seungkwan	Vernon
Dino	―	―	―

== Like Seventeen concerts ==
Like Seventeen
Date	Track listing	Members
11 May 2013	1. "Abertura da segunda temporada" – Seventeen; 2. "4 Minutes" (District 78 Remix) – Madonna feat. Justin Timberlake; 3. "Yeah 3x" – Chris Brown; 4. "Bom Bom Bom" – Roy Kim; 5. "Just A Feeling" – S.E.S.; 6. "See Through" – Primary feat. Gaeko & Zion.T; 7. "Diva" – Beyoncé; 8. "Love You Till I Die" – MC Mong; 9. "I Get It In" – Omarion feat. Gucci Mane; 10. "Hello" – NU'EST; 11. "O" – DBSK; 12. "Gangnam Style" – PSY; 13. "Gentleman" – PSY	1. DK, Seungkwan, and Seventeen; 2. Hoshi, Woozi, Samuel; 3. Hoshi, Wonwoo, Woozi, Mingyu, Vernon, Samuel; 4. Joshua, Seungkwan; 5. Joshua, Seungkwan, Hyojeong (Music friend), Bomi (Music friend); 6. Woozi, DK, Shinhye (Music friend), Gahee (Music friend); 7. Jun, Wonwoo, Woozi, Samuel, Doyoon, Semin (Music friend), Jinah (Music friend); 8. S.Coups, Mingyu, Dongjin, Jikyung (Music friend); 9. Hoshi, Vernon, Dino, Mingming, Taeyeob (Music friend), Jihye (Music friend), Yujin (Music friend); 10. S.Coups, Jun, Hoshi, Woozi, DK, Mingyu, Seungkwan, Vernon, Dino, Doyoon, Mingming; 11. S.Coups, Hoshi, Wonwoo, Woozi, Mingyu, Seungkwan, Vernon, Dino, Doyoon, Samuel; 12. Seventeen; 13. Seventeen
Like Seventeen 2
17 August 2013	1. "Somebody to Love" – BIGBANG; 2. "Dangerous" – Michael Jackson; 3. "You & I, Heart Fluttering" – Acoustic Collabo; 4. "Love Light" – CNBLUE; 5. "With You" – Chris Brown; 6. "A Doll" – Leeteuk and Yesung; 7. "White" – Eternal Morning; 8. "Merry Go Round" – Untouchable; 9. "Chase Our Love" – Chris Brown; 10. "Cooking Cooking" – Super Junior-H; 11. "Mannequin" – Trish; 12. "Fine China" – Chris Brown; 13. "Call Me Maybe" – Carly Rae Jepsen; 14. "One Thing – One Direction; 15. "Mobbin" – Iamsu!; 16. "Titanium" – David Guetta; 17. "Dang Dang Dang" – Supreme Team; 18. "Saturday Night" (Originally "Friday Night") – Dynamic Duo; 19. "This Is The Moment" from Jekyll & Hyde – Cho Seung-woo; 20. "Action" – NU'EST; 21. "Later Later" – Jang Yun-jeong; 22. "Happiness" – Super Junior; 23. "Saturday Night" – Son Dambi; 24. "Aing" – Orange Caramel; 25. "Diva" – After School	1. S.Coups, Hoshi, Woozi, Mingyu, Seungkwan, Vernon, Doyoon; 2. Seventeen; 3. Joshua, DK; 4. Hoshi, Wonwoo, Doyoon; 5. Woozi; 6. Woozi, Seungkwan; 7. S.Coups; 8. S.Coups, Seungkwan; 9. S.Coups, Hoshi, Woozi, Mingyu, Doyoon; 10. Hoshi, Wonwoo, Dino, Dongjin; 11. Pledis Girls Trainees; 12. Jun, Wonwoo, Vernon, Dino, Mingming; 13. Jun, Wonwoo, Vernon, Dino, Mingming, Pledis Girls Trainees; 14. Joshua, Hoshi, Woozi, DK, Seungkwan; 15. Hoshi, Seungkwan, Vernon, Dino, Dongjin; 16. Hoshi, Seungkwan, Vernon, Dino, Dongjin; 17. S.Coups, Mingyu; 18. S.Coups, Wonwoo, Mingyu, Vernon, Dino; 19. Seventeen; 20. Seventeen; 21. S.Coups, Joshua, Jun, Hoshi; 22. S.Coups, Jeonghan, Jun, Hoshi, Mingyu, Seungkwan, Vernon; 23. Seventeen; 24. Seventeen; 25. Seventeen
Like Seventeen 3
23 November 2013	1. "Robot Remains" – Jabbawockeez; 2. "Breath" – BEAST; 3. "Sunday Morning" – Maroon 5; 4. "Butterfly Grave" – Take; 5. "You're My Baby" – Vanilla Acoustic; 6. "Winter Mountain" – (with original lyrics) [Illinit]; 7. "From The Beginning Until Now" – Winter Sonata OST; 8. "Last Love" – Kim Bum-soo; 9. "That You're Mine" – Huh Gak feat. Swings; 10. "Look At Me Now" – Yang Yo-seob; 11. "Officially Missing You, Too" – Geeks feat. Soyou; 12. "Airplanes" – [B.o.B. feat. Hayley Williams]; 13. "My Homies Still" – Lil Wayne; 14. "Headband" – [B.o.B.]; 15. "Two Melodies" – Zion.T; 16. "Fireworks – Dynamic Duo; 17. "Warrior Descendants" – H.O.T.; 18. "Entertainer" – PSY	1. Seventeen; 2. S.Coups, Jun, Hoshi, Wonwoo, DK, Doyoon; 3. Joshua, Woozi; 4. Joshua, Woozi, DK, Seungkwan; 5. Wonwoo; 6. S.Coups; 7. Jun, Seungkwan; 8. Seungkwan; 9. Jeonghan, Wonwoo, DK, Doyoon; 10. Woozi (with Wonwoo, DK, Seungkwan and Vernon as dancers); 11. S.Coups, Hoshi, Yoo Ara (Hello Venus); 12. Woozi, Vernon; 13. Hoshi, Wonwoo, DK, Mingyu, Dongjin; 14. S.Coups, Jeonghan, Jun, Seungkwan, Vernon; 15. Hoshi, Vernon; 16. S.Coups, Wonwoo, Mingyu, Dino; 17. Seventeen; 18. Seventeen
Like Seventeen 4
16 August 2014	1. "Robot Remains" – Jabbawockeez; 2. "Mirotic" – DBSK; 3. "Wild Eyes" – Shinhwa; 4. "Action" – NU'EST; 5. "Purple Line" – DBSK; 6. "Beautiful Life" – [V.O.S.]; 7. A Midsummer Night's Sweetness Sunshine Remix; 8. "Just For Fun" – Seventeen; 9. "Dang Dang Dang" – Supreme Team; 10. "Attendance Check" – Dynamic Duo; 11. "Later Later" – Jang Yun-jeong; 12. "Crush" – Sandeul; 13. "One Thing" – One Direction; 14. "FLY" – Geeks; 15. "Like I Love You" – Justin Timberlake; 16. "Stupid Liar" – BIGBANG; 17. "Sorry, Sorry" – Super Junior; 18. "The Lone Duckling" – g.o.d 19. "Love You Till I Die" – MC Mong; 20. "Love Letter" – Happy Pledis	1. Seventeen; 2. S.coups, Jeonghan, Jun, Hoshi, Mingyu, Vernon, Wonwoo; 3. Joshua, Woozi, DK, THE8, Dongjin; 4. Seventeen; 5. Seventeen; 6. Jeonghan, Hoshi, DK, Seungkwan, Dongjin; 7. S.Coups, Wonwoo, Vernon; 8. S.Coups, Wonwoo, Woozi, Vernon; 9. S.Coups, Wonwoo, Mingyu, Vernon, Dino; 10. S.Coups, Wonwoo, Mingyu, Vernon, Dino; 11. S.Coups, Joshua, Jun, Hoshi, THE8; 12. Woozi, DK, Seungkwan; 13. Hoshi, Joshua, DK, THE8, Seungkwan; 14. S.Coups, Joshua, Hoshi, Wonwoo, Woozi, DK, THE8; 15. Hoshi, Wonwoo, Mingyu; 16. S.Coups, Woozi, DK, Seungkwan, Vernon, Dino; 17. Seventeen; 18. Seventeen; 19. Seventeen; 20. Seventeen
