= Jeonghan X Joshua =

South Korean musical duo

- Also known as: JxJ
- Origin: Seoul, South Korea
- Genre: K-pop
- Years active: 2026–present
- Label: Pledis
- Spinoff of: Seventeen
- Members: Jeonghan; Joshua

Jeonghan X Joshua (Korean: 정한X조슈아; also known as JxJ) is a sub-unit of South Korean boy band Seventeen, consisting of vocal team members Jeonghan and Joshua. Formed by Pledis Entertainment in 2026, the duo debuted on October 19, with the extended play (EP) Dreamscape.

== History ==
In June 2026, Seventeen member Jeonghan completed his mandatory military service, becoming the first member of the group to do so. The next month, Pledis Entertainment announced that he and Joshua would form Seventeen's seventh sub-unit. Their six-track debut extended play (EP), Dreamscape, was released on October 19 that year, and includes lead single "12 O'Clock" alongside solo songs from each member. To promote the EP, the duo embarked on a tour across six cities in Asia, starting in October and due to finish in February 2027. Attendance for the first three shows in Incheon, South Korea, was reported at around 25,000. The setlist included all six songs from Dreamscape and versions of songs from Seventeen's wider catalogue.

== Discography ==
=== Extended plays ===
List of extended plays, showing selected details, selected chart positions, sales figures, and certifications
Title	Details	Peak chart positions			Sales	Certifications
Title	Details	KOR	JPN	JPN Hot	Sales	Certifications
Dreamscape	Released: October 19, 2026; Label: Pledis; Formats: CD, digital download, streaming	1	1	3	KOR: 924,625	RIAJ: Gold (phy.)

=== Singles ===
List of singles, showing year released, selected chart positions, and name of the album
Title	Year	Peak chart position	Album
Title	Year	KOR	Album
"12 O'Clock"	2026	85	Dreamscape

=== Other charted songs ===
List of songs, showing year released, selected chart positions, and name of the album
Title	Year	Peak chart position	Album
Title	Year	KOR DL	Album
"Not Personal" (Joshua solo)	2026	6	Dreamscape
"Coloring" (Jeonghan solo)	2026	15	Dreamscape
"Like you"	2026	16	Dreamscape
"One Plus One"	2026	17	Dreamscape
"Outside"	2026	18	Dreamscape
"No Looking Back"	2026	19	Dreamscape

== Videography ==
=== Music videos ===
Title	Year	Director(s)	Ref.
"12 O'Clock"	2026	Jinmyung Lee	

== Live performances ==
=== Jeonghan X Joshua Journey into Dreaming ===
List of concerts, showing event names, dates, cities, countries, venues and attendance
Date (2026)	City	Country	Venue	Ref.
October 30	Incheon	South Korea	Inspire Arena	
October 31	Incheon	South Korea	Inspire Arena	
November 1	Incheon	South Korea	Inspire Arena	
November 21	Saitama	Japan	Belluna Dome	
November 22	Saitama	Japan	Belluna Dome	
December 11	Macau	China	Galaxy Arena	
December 12	Macau	China	Galaxy Arena	
January 9	Taipei	Taiwan	Taipei Arena	
January 10	Taipei	Taiwan	Taipei Arena	
January 30	Busan	South Korea	BEXCO	
January 31	Busan	South Korea	BEXCO	
February 20	Hong Kong	China	AsiaWorld–Arena	
February 21	Hong Kong	China	AsiaWorld–Arena	
