= SPACEMAP =

South Korean space company

- SpaceMap Logo
- Native name: 스페이스맵
- Type: Private
- Industry: Aerospace
- Founded: September 16, 2021; 4 years ago in Seoul, South Korea
- Founder: Douglas Deok-Soo Kim
- Headquarters: Seoul, South Korea
- Website: spacemap42.com

SPACEMAP (Korean: 스페이스맵) is a South Korean satellite orbit optimization and satellite communications company headquartered in Seoul, South Korea. The company was founded in 2021 by CEO, Douglas Deok-Soo Kim, as an offshoot of Hanyang University. It was funded by the Leader Research grant from the National Research Foundation of Korea with the goal of capitalizing on the growing space industry.

== History ==
Kim initially began research into Voronoi diagrams at the University of Michigan. He met with Dr. Misoon Ma, former director of the Asia Division of the U.S. Air Force Office of Scientific Research (AFOSR) and was recruited to work with the U.S. Air force, using Voronoi diagrams for a satellite collision prevention program. After his work with the U.S. Air Force, Kim founded SPACEMAP Inc in September 2021. In 2023, the company was selected by Korea's Tech Incubator Program for Startups (TIPS) to be funded up to 17 billion KRW (approx. US$13 million) in 3 years.

== Technology ==
The services provided by SPACEMAP are based on using dynamic Voronoi diagrams to predict satellite orbits with the aim of enhancing space mission safety and efficiency. For complex problems involving many moving points, Voronoi diagrams maintain a near-constant computation time regardless of the number of points involved. By utilizing Voronoi diagrams and artificial intelligence, the software can easily determine the number of neighboring satellites surrounding a specific satellite and calculate the distances between them, thereby predicting the probability of a collision. SPACEMAP claims their method to be superior in computational time and memory efficiency, compared to the previously established three-filter method.

== Products ==
Demonstration of AstroOne

SPACEMAP offers satellite products and services including the following:

- AstroOne, a conjunction assessment, and optimal collision avoidance service for all space vehicles in both orbital and non-orbital motions.
- AstroOrca, providing data transmission for satellites in multiple orbits, launch optimization, shuttle logistics for space gas stations, and Active Debris Removal (ADR) itinerary.
- AstroLibrary, a library of RESTful APIs to access the C++ implementation of SPACEMAP's Voronoi diagram algorithms wrapped in a Python interface.

It also provides real-time tracking of the North Korean reconnaissance satellite, Malligyong-1.
