= This Man (single album) =

- Digital cover

Single album by Jeonghan x Wonwoo
- Released: June 17, 2024
- Studio: Universe Factory
- Genre: Ballad; Dance; R&B
- Length: 9:30
- Language: Korean; English
- Label: Pledis; YG Plus

Singles from This Man
- 1. "Last Night" Released: June 17, 2024

This Man is the debut single album by Jeonghan x Wonwoo, (Note: Also referred to as JxW.) a sub-unit of the South Korean boy band Seventeen. It was released on June 17, 2024, alongside its lead single "Last Night", featuring guitarist Park Ju-won, and currently holds the highest first-week sales record for an album released by a K-pop sub-unit.

== Background ==
On May 19, 2024, Pledis Entertainment announced a new Seventeen sub-unit comprising group members Jeonghan and Wonwoo via a logo trailer and a video teaser entitled "The City", revealing news of their upcoming single album This Man. This release marked the debut of Jeonghan x Wonwoo as Seventeen's second official sub-unit, after BSS' inception in 2018.

== Promotion and release ==
Prior to its release, This Man was promoted with the staggered rollout of a scheduler video, various teaser clips, and a soundtrack film. On June 8, 2024, the album was revealed to be composed of three tracks: the lead single "Last Night", Jeonghan's solo track "Beautiful Monster", and Wonwoo's solo track "Leftover". Concept photos of the single album were digitally released and later used as outdoor advertisements across districts Seongsu, Myeongdong, and Gangnam in Seoul, as well as Shibuya in Tokyo. On June 13, "Profile of This Man", an audiobook teaser video narrated by Jeonghan and Wonwoo, was released. A themed pop-up store featuring clothing, merchandise, and a photo zone was open from June 18–24 at the Times Square mall in Seoul to commemorate the release of the album.

This Man was digitally and physically released on June 17, 2024. Its lead single, "Last Night", was released alongside a music video on the same day. On non-Korean platforms, the album was released under the artist name JxW. On June 18, Full Story of This Man, an audiobook voiced by Jeonghan and Wonwoo, was released.

On June 20, a collaboration between Jeonghan x Wonwoo and luxury chocolate brand Godiva was announced, launching Godiva's This Man Edition, a limited edition offering that includes three types of chocolates selected by Jeonghan and Wonwoo, as well as a special package that features chocolates and biscuits reflecting the album's design. Desserts inspired by the album were also made available across all Godiva stores located in South Korea.

=== Concept ===
Inspired by an urban legend that people from all over the world encounter the same mysterious man in their dreams, the album's story was written by Cho Ye-eun, a thriller and horror novelist whose achievements include the Excellence Prize at the 2nd Goldenbough Time Leap Fiction Contest and the Grand Prize at the 4th Kyobo Story Contest. As revealed in the audiobook teaser, the titular man is introduced by Jeonghan as a fugitive who had turned to the world of dreams to escape the feeling of losing someone precious; in contrast, Wonwoo described him as an "observer of the city", who gifts people who wander through shallow dreams with sweet sleep.

== Commercial performance ==
On the first day of its release, This Man was reported to have sold 537,083 copies. Four days after its release, the album surpassed the first-week sales record for a K-pop sub-unit, recording 694,009 copies sold. By the end of the first week, the album extended the record, totaling to 787,046 copies sold.

== Track listing ==
This Man track listing
No.	Title	Lyrics	Music	Arrangement	Length
1.	"Last Night" (어젯밤; guitar by Park Ju-won)	Woozi; Bumzu	Woozi; Bumzu	Bumzu	2:57
2.	"Beautiful Monster" (Jeonghan solo)	Woozi; Bumzu	Woozi; Bumzu; Jintae Ko; David Brook; Mike Gonek		2:45
3.	"Leftover" (휴지통; Wonwoo solo)	Woozi; Bumzu; Wonwoo	Woozi; Bumzu; Wonwoo	Bumzu; Lee Beom-hun	3:48
Total length:					9:30

== Credits and personnel ==
Credits adapted from the single album's liner notes.

=== Studios ===
- Universe Factory – recording
- Ingrid Studio – digital editing (tracks 1, 2)
- GLab Studios – digital editing, mixing (track 3)
- Prismfilter Engineer Lab – mixing (track 1)
- Klang Studio – mixing (track 2)
- 821 Sound Mastering – mastering

=== Musicians ===
- Jeonghan – vocals (tracks 1, 2)
- Wonwoo – vocals (tracks 1, 3)
- Bumzu – backing vocals (all tracks), piano (track 1), drum programming (track 1), synthesizer (tracks 1, 2)
- Glenn – backing vocals
- Park Ju-won – guitar (track 1)
- Jintae Ko – guitar, synthesizer (track 2)
- Kim Seung-jun – guitar (track 3)
- Hey Farmer – drum programming (track 1)
- Mike Gonek – drum programming, synthesizer (track 2)
- Lee Beom-hun – piano, strings arrangement (track 3)

=== Technicians ===
- Bumzu – recording
- Jeong Eun-kyung – digital editing (tracks 1, 2)
- Park Nam-jun – digital editing, assistant mixing (track 3)
- Jin Jeon – mixing (track 1)
- Gu Jong-pil – mixing (track 2)
- Hong Jang-mi – assistant mixing (track 2)
- Shin Bong-won – mixing (track 3)
- Kwon Nam-woo – mastering

== Charts ==
=== Weekly charts ===
Weekly chart performance for This Man
Chart (2024)	Peak position
Japan (Oricon)	2
Japan Combined Singles (Oricon)	2
Japan Top Singles Sales (Billboard Japan)	2
South Korean Albums (Circle)	3

Weekly chart performance for "Last Night"
Chart (2024)	Peak position
Japan (Japan Hot 100)	3
Japan Digital Singles (Oricon)	34
South Korea (Circle)	25

Weekly chart performance for "Leftover"
Chart (2024)	Peak position
South Korea (Circle)	74

=== Monthly charts ===
Monthly chart performance for This Man
Chart (2024)	Position
Japan (Oricon)	7
South Korean Albums (Circle)	3

Monthly chart performance for "Last Night"
Chart (2024)	Position
South Korea (Circle)	130

=== Year-end charts ===
Year-end chart performance for This Man
Chart (2024)	Position
Japan (Oricon)	64
Japan Top Singles Sales (Billboard Japan)	72
South Korean Albums (Circle)	38

== Certifications ==
Certifications for This Man
Region	Certification	Certified units/sales
Japan (RIAJ) Physical	Gold	100,000^{^}
South Korea (KMCA)	2× Platinum	500,000^{^}
South Korea (KMCA) Weverse Version	Platinum	250,000^{^}
^{^} Shipments figures based on certification alone.
