= Jeonghan =

South Korean singer (born 1995)

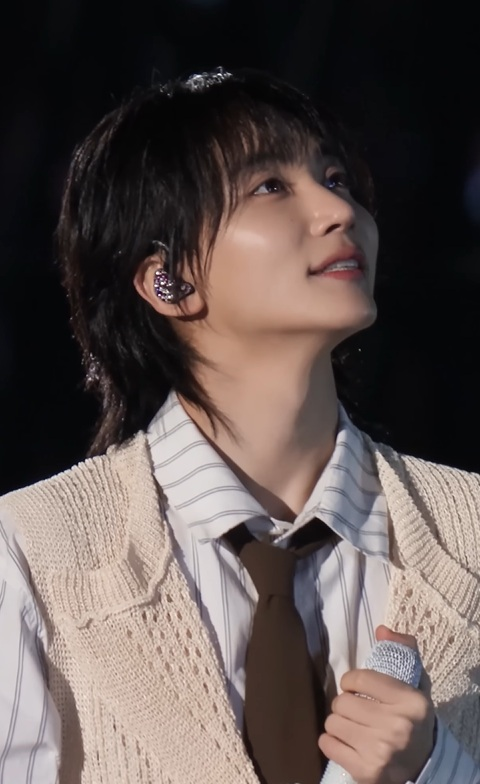
- Jeonghan in March 2024
- Born: Yoon Jeong-han; October 4, 1995 (age 31); Hwaseong, Gyeonggi, South Korea
- Education: Hanyang University; Anyang University
- Occupation: Singer
- Years active: 2015–present
- Musical career
- Genre: K-pop
- Instrument: Vocals
- Label: Pledis
- Member of: Seventeen; JxW; JxJ

Korean name
- Hangul: 윤정한
- RR: Yun Jeonghan
- MR: Yun Chŏnghan

Yoon Jeong-han (Korean: 윤정한, born October 4, 1995), known mononymously as Jeonghan, is a South Korean singer. Managed by Pledis Entertainment, he is a member of the South Korean boy band Seventeen, its vocal team, and its subunits JxW and JxJ.

== Early life and education ==
Yoon Jeonghan was born in Hwaseong, South Korea, on October 4, 1995. He has a younger sister. Jeonghan attended Hyangnam High School and graduated in 2014 as a natural science major. In 2022, he enrolled in a master's degree at Anyang University, majoring in K-pop and business administration under the Department of Applied Music.

== Career ==
=== 2013–2014: Pre-debut ===
Jeonghan was scouted by Pledis Entertainment at a subway station. After passing auditions, Jeonghan joined Pledis in 2013 and went on to receive training for the next two years. He was regularly featured on Seventeen TV, an online reality series that introduced Pledis' trainees as potential members of the then-upcoming boy group Seventeen, from its third season onward. The show was broadcast periodically on Ustream, where the trainees showed themselves training, singing, creating choreographies, and playing games. The online show also included participation in concerts, titled Like Seventeen. He trained for approximately two years and two months before Seventeen's debut.

=== 2015–present: Seventeen solo and sub-unit activities ===
In 2015, Jeonghan debuted as a member of the South Korean boy group Seventeen with the extended play 17 Carat on May 26.

On September 16, 2021, Jeonghan released a digital song named "Dream" in both Korean and Japanese, written and produced by himself and regular Seventeen collaborator Prismfilter.

In March 2022, Jeonghan released a cover of Japanese musician Mosawo's "Aitai" as a part of Seventeen's ongoing #17Studio series. In April, Jeonghan was announced as a new presenter of Tokyo FM's School of Lock program, a weekly radio show featuring musicians aiming to "hold the key to the future". He held the role until December 2023, when it was taken over by bandmate Dino. In June 2022, Jeonghan underwent surgery for an elbow injury. It was stated that he would continue participating in the group's scheduled activities, such as Seventeen's Be The Sun World Tour while wearing a cast and brace, and would also receive ongoing medical consultations.

In 2023, Jeonghan and bandmate Dino were cast in MBC every1's reality show Magic Lamp (요술램프) alongside Kim Jae-joong, Kang Hui, Lee Joo-ahn, Junpi, and Tan. The program aired during September and October that year, and entailed the group travelling together in Montpellier, France. On December 14, 2023, Pledis announced that Jeonghan underwent ankle surgery and would be absent from the group's Follow Tour and scheduled activities. On February 23, 2024, Pledis announced that Jeonghan's health had recently improved and he would return from his hiatus starting from March onward.

In June 2024, Jeonghan and his groupmate Wonwoo debuted as a new sub-unit under the name JxW with the single album This Man in June 2024. The tracklist includes Jeonghan's first commercially released solo track, titled "Beautiful Monster". Achieving commercial success, This Man broke the first-week sales record for an album released by a K-pop sub-unit within four days of its release.

In August 2024, Jeonghan and Japanese actor Kento Yamazaki were featured in a travel show titled Yamazaki Kento and Jeonghan's Miracle Journey in Korea (Japanese: 山﨑賢人×Jeonghan 奇跡旅in韓国), broadcast by Nippon TV and Hulu Japan. On January 27, 2025, Jeonghan released the song "Better Half" featuring Japanese band Omoinotake. A Japanese version of the song was featured on Omoinotake's second album Pieces, released two days later.

== Other ventures ==
=== Fashion and endorsements ===
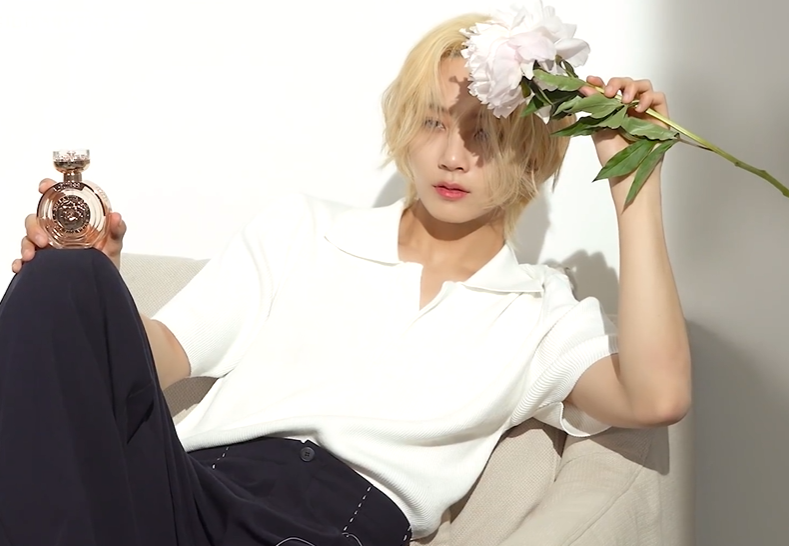
Jeonghan for Banila Co in 2021

On October 21, 2021, Jeonghan was chosen as the new ambassador for South Korean cosmetics brand Banila Co, in an attempt for the brand to expand into the Japanese markets through his popularity. The business partnership has extended into 2024, with Banila Co using Jeonghan's appearance in "Nana Tour" to continue to promote their products. On September 4, 2023, Jeonghan was chosen as the new global ambassador for South Korean clothing brand Acme De La Vie.

In January 2023, Jeonghan attended French luxury fashion house Yves Saint Laurent's Men's F/W 2023-24 Fashion Show at Paris Fashion Week. His attendance at the show coincided with magazine pictorials by Dispatch Korea and GQ Korea, as well as a magazine cover and pictorial alongside bandmate Jun for Elle Korea. Later that year, he attended the brand's 2024 Spring/Summer show in Berlin. In March 2024, following his return to work after an injury, he attended the brand's Men's F/W 2024 Fashion Show in Paris. His attendance at the event was profiled by Kevin Ponce for American magazine VMan.

On June 3, 2024, Jeonghan was chosen as the new ambassador for Acqua di Parma. On August 10, Jeonghan was announced as the new ambassador for South Korean eyewear brand Speculum, alongside bandmate The8. Jeonghan was featured on the cover of the September 2024 edition of South Korean men's magazine Man Noblesse in collaboration with Swiss luxury watchmaker Hublot. In October that year, Jeonghan was featured in Paul Smith's 'Season of Fun and Games' campaign as part of the Fall/Winter holiday collection.

Jeonghan was announced as the image model for the Japanese haircare brand &honey on April 18, 2025.

== Public image ==
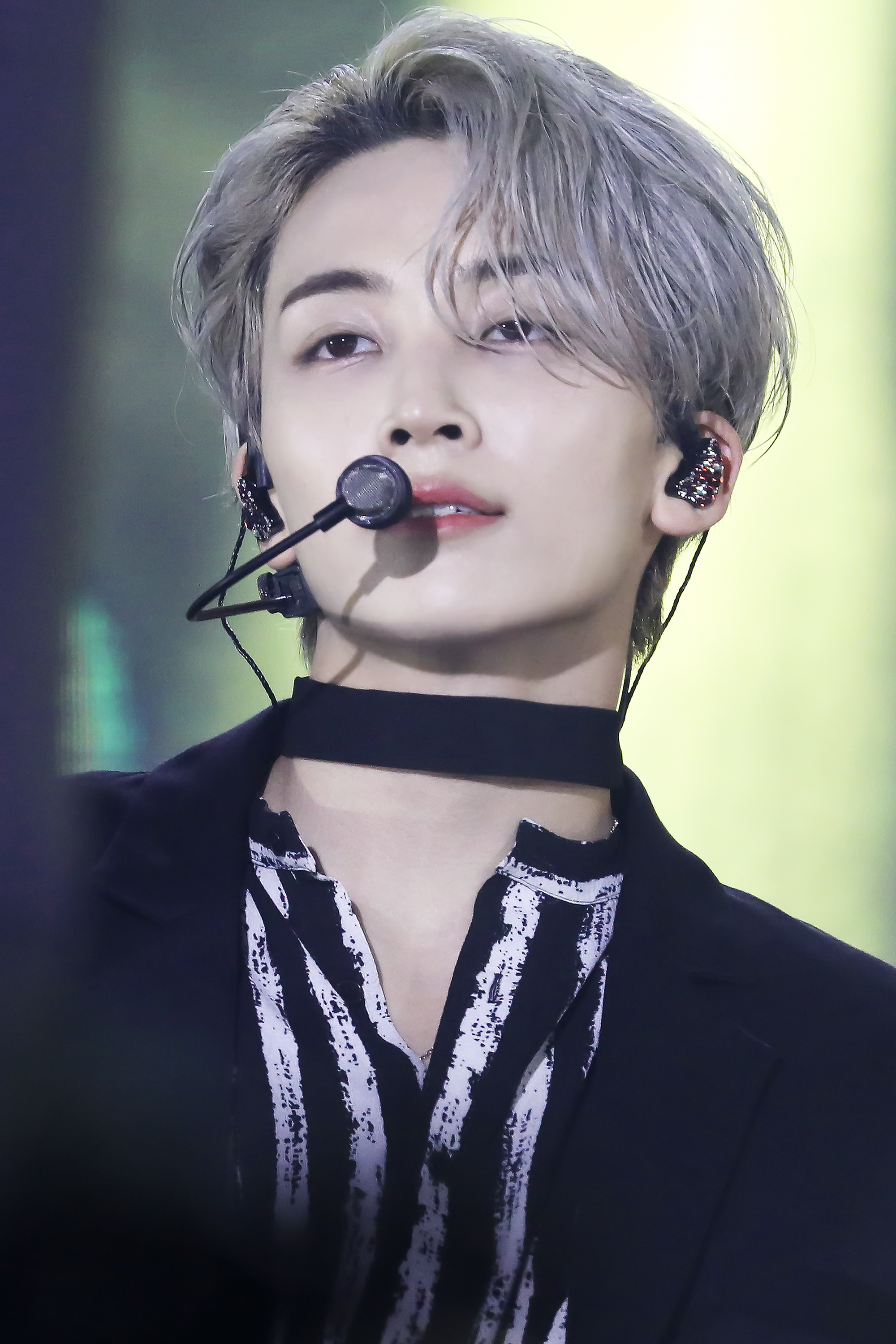
Jeonghan performing at the 25th Dream Concert in 2019

Jeonghan has earned the nickname "Angel" from media and fans due to his birthday (October 04, or 1004; Korean: 천사; RR: cheonsa) being a homonym in Korean for angel [ko], alongside his "angelic appearance".

Jeonghan has been noted for his popularity, especially in Japan, frequently landing in the top ten for Japanese rankings of popular celebrities and consistently placing in GP Korea's brand reputation ranking for idols. In 2022, Jeonghan's uploaded photos of himself in Shibuya, Tokyo on his Instagram account inspired photo spots for his fans as they queued in lines to replicate his photos.

== Personal life ==
=== Military service ===
In August 2024, Pledis Entertainment announced that Jeonghan would not participate in Seventeen's Right Here World Tour as he would be enlisting in the South Korean military by the tour's opening date in October. On September 12, Pledis announced that his enlistment date was set, and he officially began his enlistment as a social worker on September 26. He completed his service on June 25, 2026.

== Filmography ==
=== Television shows ===
| Year | Title | Role | Notes | Ref. |
|---|---|---|---|---|
| 2024 | Yamazaki Kento and Jeonghan's Miracle Journey in Korea (山﨑賢人×Jeonghan 奇跡旅in韓国) | Cast member | Also distributed on Hulu Japan | |

=== Web shows ===
| Year | Title | Role | Ref. |
|---|---|---|---|
| 2013–2014 | Seventeen TV | Cast member | |
| 2023 | Magic Lamp (요술램프) | Cast member | |

=== Radio ===
| Year | Title | Station | Role | Ref. |
|---|---|---|---|---|
| 2022–2023 | School of Lock | Tokyo FM | Fixed MC, First Monday-Thursday of every month | |

== Discography ==
=== Singles ===
| Title | Year | Peak chart positions | | | Album |
| Title | Year | KOR | JPN Hot | JPN Dig | Album |
|---|---|---|---|---|---|
| "Dream" (Note: Released in Korean and Japanese) | 2021 | — | — | — | Non-album singles |
| "Aitai" (会いたい; lit. 'I want to see you') (Note: Mosawo cover) | 2022 | — | — | — | Non-album singles |
| "Betting" (with Shingo Katori, Mingyu and Seungkwan) | 2023 | — | 31 | — | War of Traps OST |
| "Last Night" (어젯밤; guitar by Park Ju-won) (with Wonwoo) | 2024 | 25 | 3 | 34 | This Man |
| "Better Half" (Note: Released in Korean and Japanese) (with Omoinotake) | 2025 | 69 | — (Note: "Better Half" did not enter the Billboard Japan Hot 100, but peaked at number 28 on the component Download Chart.) | 30 | Pieces (Note: Japanese version only, the Korean version is a non-album single.) |
"—" denotes a recording that did not chart or was not released in that territory.

=== Other charted songs ===
| Title | Year | Peak chart positions | Album |
| Title | Year | KOR | Album |
|---|---|---|---|
| "Beautiful Monster" (Note: Credited under JxW but is a solo track performed by Jeonghan.) | 2024 | — (Note: "Beautiful Monster" did not enter the Circle Digital Chart, but peaked at number 16 on the component Download Chart.) | This Man |
| "Coincidence" (우연) (Note: Credited under Seventeen but is a solo track performed by Jeonghan.) | 2025 | 53 | Happy Burstday |

== Composition credits ==
All credits are adapted from the Korea Music Copyright Association unless stated otherwise.

| Year | Artist | Song | Album | Lyrics | | Music | | Ref. |
| Year | Artist | Song | Album | Credited | With | Credited | With | Ref. |
|---|---|---|---|---|---|---|---|---|
| 2017 | Seventeen | "Don't Wanna Cry" (울고 싶지 않아)" | Al1 | Yes | Bumzu, S.Coups, Woozi, Hoshi, Andrew Taggart, Guy Berryman, Mark Buckland, Will Champion, Chris Martin | No | —N/a | |
| 2017 | Seventeen | "We Gonna Make It Shine" (Vocal Team) | Non-album single | Yes | Bumzu, Woozi, DK, Seungkwan, Joshua | No | —N/a | |
| 2017 | Seventeen | "Without You" (모자를눌러쓰고) | Teen, Age | Yes | Bumzu, S.Coups, Woozi, Dino, Hoshi, Vernon, Mingyu, DK, The8 | No | —N/a | |
| 2017 | Seventeen | "Clap" (박수) | Teen, Age | Yes | Bumzu, Woozi, Hoshi, Mingyu, DK, Seungkwan | No | —N/a | |
| 2017 | Seventeen | "Flower" (S.Coups, Seungkwan, Wonwoo, The8, Jeonghan & Dino) | Teen, Age | Yes | Bumzu, S.Coups, Woozi, Wonwoo, Dino, Seungkwan, The8 | No | —N/a | |
| 2017 | Seventeen | "Campfire" (캠프파이어) | Teen, Age | Yes | Bumzu, S.Coups, Woozi, Wonwoo, Vernon, Mingyu, DK, Seungkwan, The8 | No | —N/a | |
| 2018 | Seventeen | "Falling for U" (Jeonghan and Joshua) | Director's Cut | Yes | Bumzu, Woozi, Joshua | Yes | Bumzu, Jeong Jae-won, Woozi, Joshua | |
| 2020 | Seventeen | "Ah! Love" (S.Coups, Jeonghan and Joshua) | Semicolon | Yes | Bumzu, S.Coups, Woozi, Joshua | No | —N/a | |
| 2021 | Seventeen | "In The Soop" | Non-album singles | Yes | Woozi, Wonwoo, Dino, Hoshi, Mingyu, DK, Joshua | No | —N/a | |
| 2021 | Jeonghan | "Dream" | Non-album singles | Yes | Glenn | Yes | Glenn, Nmore | |
