= Jeong (given name) =

- Hangul: 정
- RR: Jeong
- MR: Chŏng
- IPA: [tɕʌŋ]

Jeong, also spelled Jung or Jong, Chung, Chong is a Korean given name. Notable people with the name include:

- Jeong of Balhae (died 812), seventh King of Balhae
- Yi Chong (1541–1622), Joseon Dynasty painter
- Heo Jeong (1896–1988), Korean male independence activist and South Korean politician
- Kang Jeong (born 1971), South Korean poet
- Suh Jung (born 1972), South Korean actress
- Jang Jeong (born 1980), South Korean golfer
- Choi Jeong (born 1987), South Korean baseball player
- Kim Jong (table tennis) (born 1989), North Korean table tennis player
- Choi Jeong (Go player) (born 1996), South Korean go player

== See also ==
- List of Korean given names
