= Kang Hui (actor) =

South Korean actor (born 1991)

- Born: Lee Kang-hee; 19 November 1991 (age 34); Yeosu, South Korea
- Occupations: Actor; model; painter
- Years active: 2016–present
- Agent: KPlus
- Height: 188 cm (6 ft 2 in)

Korean name
- Hangul: 강희
- RR: Gang Hui
- MR: Kang Hŭi

Lee Kang-Hee (Korean: 이강희; born November 19, 1991), known professionally as Kang Hui (강희) is a South Korean actor, model and painter. He is known for his lead roles in the dramas Cherry Blossoms After Winter, Ending Again and Dream Change Laundromat.

== Filmography ==
=== Film ===
| Year | Title | | Role | Notes | Ref. |
| Year | English | Korean | Role | Notes | Ref. |
|---|---|---|---|---|---|
| 2018 | 107th night | 107년째 밤 | | Supporting role | |
| 2019 | Rainbow Playground | 수상한 이웃 | Jeong-wook | Supporting role | |

=== Television series ===
| Year | Title | | Network | Role | Notes | Ref. |
| Year | English | Korean | Network | Role | Notes | Ref. |
|---|---|---|---|---|---|---|
| 2016 | Thumping Spike | 두근두근 스파이크 | MBN | Park Hyun-sung | Season 1 and 2 | |
| 2017 | The Rebel | 역적: 백성을 훔친 도적 | MBC | Yeong-hui | Cameo | |
| 2017 | KBS Drama Special: Let Us Meet | 드라마 스페셜 - 만나게 해, 주오 | KBS2 | Choi-cheong | Cameo | |
| 2018 | The Undateables | 훈남정음 | SBS | Model | Cameo (Episode 4) | |
| 2018 | Familiar Wife | 아는 와이프 | tvN | Jung Min-soo | Supporting role | |

=== Web series ===
| Year | Title | | Network | Role | Notes | Ref. |
| Year | English | Korean | Network | Role | Notes | Ref. |
|---|---|---|---|---|---|---|
| 2017 | Dream Change Laundromat | 나의 아름다운 신분세탁소 | Naver TV | Yong-yi | Main cast | |
| 2020 | Ending Again | 또한번 엔딩 | WeTV, Viki | Yoo Chan-hee | Main cast | |
| 2021 | Life of Jung, Lee, Ro and Woon | 정·이·로·운 의원생활 | YouTube | Jung Dae Jin | Main cast | |
| 2021 | / | 공성치 | KakaoPage | Kang Hee | Supporting Role | |
| 2022 | Cherry Blossoms After Winter | 겨울 지나 벚꽃 | WeTV, Viki | Jo Tae Sung | Main Role | |
| 2025 | She was never a good girl | 나비야 참 착하다 | Dramabox | Moon Seo-won | Main role | |
| 202? | Today’s weather is sexy | 오늘의 날씨는 섹시 | | Kim Yeon-woo | Main Cast, announced | |

=== Television shows ===
| Year | Title | | Network | Role | Notes | Ref. |
| Year | English | Korean | Network | Role | Notes | Ref. |
|---|---|---|---|---|---|---|
| 2017 | Show Me Oppa | 쑈미옵빠 | JTBC | Regular cast | | |
| 2023 | Magic Lamp | 요술램프 | MBC every1 | Regular cast | | |

=== Music video appearances ===
| Year | Title | Artist | Length | Ref. |
|---|---|---|---|---|
| 2015 | "Yes I Do" | Almeng | 3:42 | |
| 2020 | "Not Anyone Else" (다른 누구 말고 너야) | Kim Na-young | 8:01 | |
| 2022 | "Winter Spring" (겨울봄) | Isegye Idol | 4:45 | |
| 2024 | "Come Play With Me" | Raspberry Field | 4:39 | |
