= Wonwoo =

South Korean rapper and singer (born 1996)

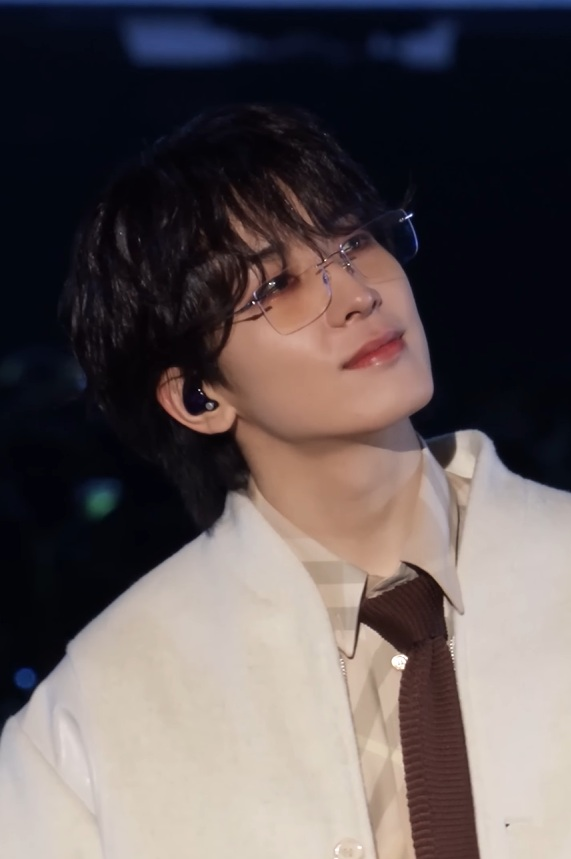
- Wonwoo in March 2024
- Born: Jeon Won-woo; July 17, 1996 (age 30); Changwon, South Korea
- Occupations: Rapper; singer; songwriter
- Musical career
- Genres: K-pop; Hip hop
- Instrument: Vocals
- Years active: 2015–present
- Label: Pledis
- Member of: Seventeen; JxW

Korean name
- Hangul: 전원우
- RR: Jeon Wonu
- MR: Chŏn Wŏnu

Jeon Won-woo (Korean: 전원우; born July 17, 1996), known mononymously as Wonwoo (원우), is a South Korean rapper and singer. Managed by Pledis Entertainment, he is a member of the South Korean boy band Seventeen, its hip hop team, and its second subunit, JxW.

== Early life and education ==
Jeon Wonwoo was born in Changwon, South Korea, on July 17, 1996. He attended the School of Performing Arts Seoul and graduated in 2015.

== Career ==
=== 2011–2014: Pre-debut ===
Wonwoo joined Pledis Entertainment in 2011, while in his third year of middle school., where he would undergo singing and dancing training for four years. As a trainee, he participated from the first season onwards of Seventeen TV, an online reality show that introduced Pledis' trainees and showed potential members of the boy group Seventeen before their official debut. The show was broadcast periodically on Ustream, where the trainees showed themselves training, singing, creating choreographies and playing games. The online show also included participation in concerts, titled Like Seventeen.

=== 2015–present: Seventeen and solo and sub-unit activities ===
In 2015, Wonwoo debuted as a member of the South Korean boy group Seventeen with the extended play 17 Carat on May 29. Within the 13-member group, he was selected to be a member of its hip-hop unit. Since debuting in Seventeen, he has participated in the songwriting of over 35 songs, the majority of which being songs performed by the hip-hop unit.

In 2021, Wonwoo and Seventeen bandmate Mingyu released a digital single titled "Bittersweet", featuring Lee Hi. "Bittersweet" ranked first on the iTunes song chart in ten regions upon release.

In 2022, Wonwoo released a cover of IU's "Knees" as a tribute to his late mother.

In 2023, Wonwoo was featured in Dive Studio's Mindset series, releasing three episodes detailing his relationship with his mental health.

In 2024, Wonwoo and bandmate Jeonghan debuted as Seventeen's second official subunit named Jeonghan X Wonwoo, alternatively known as JxW, with the single album This Man. The album featured three tracks, including Wonwoo's first commercially released solo song "Leftover", where he is credited for songwriting. Achieving commercial success, This Man broke the first-week sales record for an album released by a K-pop sub-unit within four days of its release.

== Other ventures ==
=== Fashion and ambassadorships ===
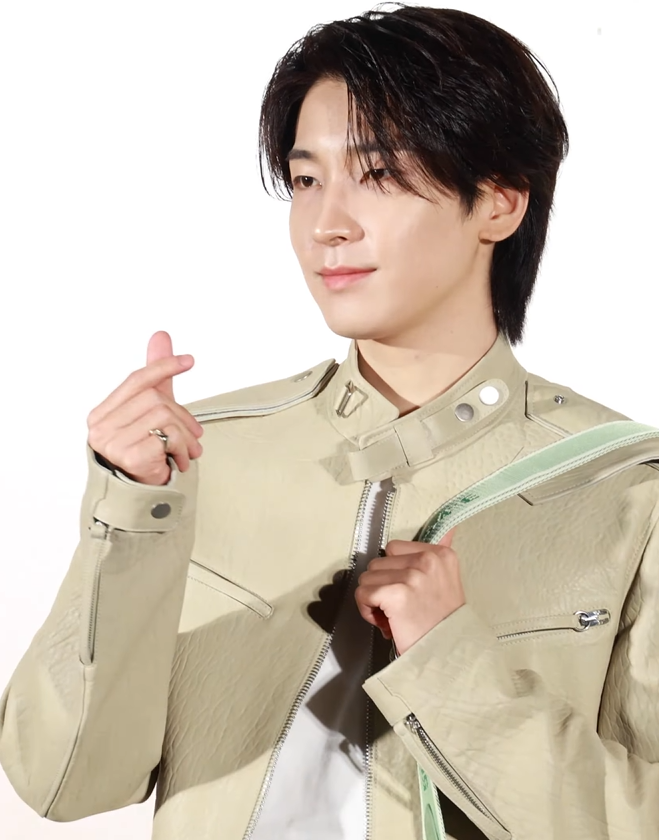
Wonwoo at a Rimowa event in 2024

In November 2022, Wonwoo was announced as the new sole model for South Korean cosmetic brand Huxley. In June 2023, Wonwoo made his first appearance on the cover of Japanese fashion magazine Men's Non-no, alongside Seventeen member DK. The pair would go on to be featured in other issues cataloguing their fashion. He would again be featured on the cover for the magazine's July 2024 issue alongside Jeonghan, in promotion of This Man. In September 2023, Wonwoo attended British luxury fashion house Burberry's opening of their new pop-up store in Seoul. He then attended the brand's 2025 Autumn/Winter fashion show at London Fashion Week in February 2025.

In March 2024, Wonwoo attended an event for luxury suitcase brand Rimowa in Seoul. In April, he was announced as the new global model for South Korean cosmetic brand The Face Shop. In June, Wonwoo, alongside Seventeen members S.Coups and Vernon, became the new global brand ambassadors for Chitato, an Indonesian snack brand under Indofood. In December, he was selected as the newest brand ambassador for Japanese optical brand Jins Eyewear.

=== Philanthropy ===
In March 2019, Wonwoo donated his personal items for auction by Nabiya Cat Shelter, an animal shelter in Seoul. He again donated items for their 2022 auction drive.

== Personal life ==
Wonwoo lives in Seoul with bandmate Mingyu. He enjoys video games, frequently hosting livestreams of games via Weverse. He is a fan of South Korean esports team T1.

=== Military service ===
On March 5, 2025, Pledis Entertainment announced that Wonwoo would begin his mandatory military service on April 3, after Seventeen's fan meeting in Incheon. He began serving as a social service worker on that date.

== Discography ==
=== Singles ===
Title	Year	Peak chart positions			Album
Title	Year	KOR	JPN Hot	JPN Dig	Album
"Bittersweet" (with Mingyu, featuring Lee Hi)	2021	— (Note: "Bittersweet" did not enter the Circle Digital Chart, but peaked at number 43 on the component Download Chart.)	—	—	Non-album single
"Last Night" (어젯밤; guitar by Park Ju-won) (with Jeonghan)	2024	25	3	34	This Man
"Gogae" (고개)	2025	157	—	—	Non-album singles
"Spring, Summer, Fall, Winter" (봄, 여름, 가을, 겨울)	2026	103	—	—	Non-album singles
"—" denotes a recording that did not chart or was not released in that territory

=== Other charted songs ===
Title	Year	Peak chart positions	Album
Title	Year	KOR	Album
"Leftover" (휴지통) (Note: Credited under JxW but is a solo track performed by Wonwoo.)	2024	74	This Man
"99.9%" (Note: Credited under Seventeen but is a solo track performed by Wonwoo.)	2025	7	Happy Burstday

=== Composition credits ===
All credits are adapted from the Korea Music Copyright Association.

Year	Artist	Song	Album	Lyrics		Music	
Year	Artist	Song	Album	Credited	With	Credited	With
2015	Seventeen	"Ah Yeah"	17 Carat	Yes	S.Coups, Woozi, Mingyu, Vernon	No	—N/a
2015	Seventeen	"Fronting" (표정관리) (S.Coups, Hoshi, Wonwoo, Woozi, Mingyu and Vernon)	Boys Be	Yes	S.Coups, Woozi, Mingyu, Vernon	No	—N/a
2015	Seventeen	"Mansae" (만세)	Boys Be	Yes	Bumzu, S.Coups, Woozi, Mingyu, Vernon	No	—N/a
2015	Seventeen	"Rock"	Boys Be	Yes	S.Coups, Woozi, Vernon	No	—N/a
2015	Seventeen	"Chuck" (엄지척)	Love & Letter	Yes	S.Coups, Woozi, Mingyu, Dino, Vernon	No	—N/a
2015	Seventeen	"Still Lonely" (이놈의인기)	Love & Letter	Yes	Woozi, Hoshi, Vernon, Seungkwan	No	—N/a
2015	Seventeen	"Monday to Saturday" (만세) (Hip Hop Team Version)	Love & Letter	Yes	Bumzu, S.Coups, Woozi, Mingyu, Vernon	No	—N/a
2015	Seventeen	"Love Letter" (사랑쪽지)	Love & Letter	Yes	S.Coups, Woozi, Mingyu, Vernon	No	—N/a
2016	Seventeen	No F.U.N	Love & Letter - Repackage album	Yes	Woozi, Hoshi, Vernon, S.Coups, Seungkwan, Dino	No	—N/a
2016	Seventeen	"Space" (끝이안보여)	Love & Letter - Repackage album	Yes	Bumzu, S.Coups, Mingyu, Vernon	No	—N/a
2016	Seventeen	"Boom Boom" (붐붐)	Going Seventeen	Yes	Bumzu, S.Coups, Woozi, Mingyu, Vernon	No	—N/a
2016	Seventeen	"Lean On Me" (기대) (Hip Hop Team)	Going Seventeen	Yes	Bumzu, S.Coups, Mingyu, Vernon	No	—N/a
2017	Seventeen	"Flower" (S.Coups, Seungkwan, Wonwoo, The8, Jeonghan, & Dino)	Teen, Age	Yes	S.Coups, The8, Dino, Seungkwan, Jeonghan, Woozi, Bumzu	No	—N/a
2017	Seventeen	"Trauma" (Hip Hop Team)	Teen, Age	Yes	S.Coups, Mingyu, Vernon	No	—N/a
2017	Seventeen	"Campfire" (캠프파이어)	Teen, Age	Yes	Bumzu, S.Coups, Woozi, Mingyu, Vernon, DK, Seungkwan, The8, Jeonghan	No	—N/a
2018	Seventeen	"Thinkin' About You"	Director's Cut	Yes	Woozi, Bumzu, Vernon, S.Coups, Mingyu	No	—N/a
2018	Seventeen	"MMO" (Hip Hop Team)	Non-album singles	Yes	S.Coups, Mingyu, Vernon	No	—N/a
2018	Seventeen	"Joker" (Hip Hop Team)	Non-album singles	Yes	S.Coups, Mingyu, Vernon	No	—N/a
2018	Seventeen	"Un Haeng Il Chi" (언행일치)(言行一致) (Hip Hop Team)	Non-album singles	Yes	Bumzu, S.Coups, Mingyu, Vernon	No	—N/a
2018	Seventeen	"What's the Problem" (Hip Hop Team)	Non-album singles	Yes	S.Coups, Mingyu, Vernon	No	—N/a
2018	Seventeen	"Holiday"	You Make My Day	Yes	Bumzu, Woozi, S.Coups	No	—N/a
2018	Seventeen	"What's Good" (Hip Hop Team)	You Make My Day	Yes	S.Coups, Mingyu, Vernon	No	—N/a
2018	Seventeen	"Our Dawn Is Hotter Than Day" (우리의새벽은낮보다뜨겁다)	You Make My Day	Yes	Bumzu, S.Coups, Woozi, Mingyu, Vernon	No	—N/a
2018	Seventeen	"Chilli" (칠리) (Hip Hop Team)	You Make My Day	Yes	S.Coups, Mingyu, Vernon	No	—N/a
	Tobi Lou	"17cg"	Live on Ice	Yes	Bumzu, S.Coups, Woozi, Park Ki-tae, Tobi Lou	Yes	Bumzu, S.Coups, Woozi, Park, Tobi Lou
2019	Seventeen	"Back It Up" (Hip Hop Team)	An Ode	Yes	S.Coups, Mingyu, Vernon	No	—N/a
2020	Seventeen	"I wish" (좋겠다)	Heng:garæ	Yes	Bumzu, Woozi, Hwang Hyeon	No	—N/a
2020	Seventeen	"Light a Flame" (마음에불을지펴) (Jun, Hoshi, Wonwoo and Woozi)	Semicolon	Yes	Bumzu, Woozi, Hoshi	No	—N/a
2021	Wonwoo and Mingyu	"Bittersweet" (feat. Lee Hi)	Non-album single	Yes	Bumzu, Mingyu, Jo Yoon-kyeong	No	—N/a
2021	Seventeen	"GAM3 BO1" (Hip Hop Team)	Your Choice	Yes	Bumzu, S.Coups, Mingyu, Woozi, Vernon	No	—N/a
2021	Seventeen	"In The Soop"	Non-album single	Yes	Woozi, Mingyu, Dino, Hoshi, Joshua, DK, Jeonghan	No	—N/a
2021	Seventeen	"I can't run away" (그리워하는것까지) (Hip Hop Team)	Attacca	Yes	Bumzu, S.Coups, Mingyu, Woozi, Vernon	Yes	Bumzu, Mingyu, Woozi, Vernon, Lee Min-gyu
2022	Seventeen	"Don Quixote"	Face the Sun	Yes	Bumzu, Woozi, Melanie Joy Fontana, Michel Shulz, Steven Robert Franks, Tommy Brown	Yes	Bumzu, Woozi, Fontana, Shulz, Franks, Brown
2023	Seventeen	"Fire" (Hip Hop Team)	FML	Yes	Bumzu, S.Coups, Mingyu, Woozi, Vernon	No	—N/a
2023	Seventeen	"Monster" (Hip Hop Team)	Seventeenth Heaven	Yes	Bumzu, S.Coups, Mingyu, Woozi, Vernon	No	—N/a
2024	Seventeen	"Lalali" (Hip Hop Team)	17 Is Right Here	Yes	Bumzu, S.Coups, Mingyu, Woozi, Vernon	No	—N/a
2024	JxW	"Leftover" (휴지통) (Wonwoo Solo)	This Man	Yes	Bumzu, Woozi	Yes	Bumzu, Woozi
2024	Seventeen	"Water" (Hip Hop Team)	Spill the Feels	Yes	Vernon, S.Coups, Mingyu, Bumzu	No	—N/a
2025	Seventeen	"Encircled" (동그라미)	Non-album single	Yes	S.Coups, Woozi, Dino, Hoshi, Vernon, Mingyu, DK, Seungkwan, Jun, The8, Joshua	No	—N/a
