= Dhruv (singer) =

- Born: Dhruv Sharma; 25 February 1999 (age 27); London, England
- Genres: Pop; indie pop
- Occupation: Singer-songwriter
- Years active: 2019–present
- Labels: RCA; Little Worry
- Website: dhrvie.com

Dhruv Sharma (born February 25, 1999), known mononymously as Dhruv, is a British-born singer-songwriter. His 2019 single "Double Take", became a sleeper hit after it went viral on TikTok two years after its release. In 2021, the song went No. 1 in the Philippines and Thailand, and reached the top five of Malaysia, Indonesia, and Singapore's streaming charts.

== Early life ==
Dhruv Sharma was born on February 25, 1999, in London to an Indian Hindu family. He moved to Singapore at the age of two. He learned the piano as a child and began writing melodies at a young age. Dhruv started pursuing and writing music seriously at the age of 15, and began uploading self-recorded demos to SoundCloud while living in Singapore. At the age of 18 he moved to New Haven, Connecticut to attend Yale University. During his time at Yale, Dhruv performed as a member of the Shades of Yale a cappella group. Dhruv would go on to pause his studies in 2020, prior to the virality of "Double Take", in order to pursue music full time.

== Career ==
Sharma released his debut single "double take" on May 24, 2019, while he was still a student at Yale University. This was followed by the release of singles "moonlight" and "vulnerable" the following year. Sharma rose to prominence in 2021 when "double take" went viral on social media. "double take" eventually debuted on the Billboard Global Excl. US Chart. Sharma was signed to RCA in October 2021.

He released his extended play "rapunzel" on January 21, 2022. He later released a standalone single "Blur" in 2022 and was a support act for Joji on his 2022 North American Smithereens Tour.

On January 19, 2024, Dhruv released "Tragedy", the lead single from his forthcoming debut studio album, after taking a brief hiatus from releasing music.

Later in 2024, he released three more singles in "How?", "Speed of Light" and "Grieving".

On 31 May 2024, RCA Records announced that Dhruv's debut album "Private Blizzard" set for release on 23 August 2024.

The "double take" singer has taken to his Instagram account and announced his sophomore album, which will be released in 2026.

== Discography ==
=== Studio albums ===
- Private Blizzard (2024)

=== Extended Play ===
- rapunzel (2022)

=== Singles ===
- double take (2019)
- moonlight (2019)
- vulnerable (2020)
- airplane thoughts (2021)
- stable life (2021)
- Blur (2022)
- Tragedy (2024)
- How? (2024)
- Speed of Light (2024)
- Grieving (2024)
- Dalmatian (2026)
