= Double Take (Dhruv song) =

"double take"

Single by Dhruv
- Language: English
- Released: 24 May 2019
- Genre: Contemporary R&B
- Length: 2:51
- Label: RCA Records
- Songwriters: Dhruv; Frankie Scoca
- Producers: Mat Ferraro; Frankie Scoca

Music video
- "double take" on YouTube

"Double Take" (stylised in lowercase) is a single recorded by the singer Dhruv. Originally released independently in 2019, the song went viral on TikTok in 2021, two years after its initial release. In 2022, the song was added to the track listing of his debut EP Rapunzel. The song is 109 BPM and is about falling in love with a friend.

== Commercial performance ==
As of 2025, the TikTok videos featuring the song have clocked 285.6 million views, the official YouTube audio video for the song has 172.8 million views, and on Spotify alone, the song has more than 1 billion streams. The song also debuted on the Billboard Global Excl. US Chart.

== Personnel ==
All credits are adapted from Apple Music.

Musicians

- Dhruv – vocals

Technical

- Dhruv – songwriter
- Franike Scoca – songwriter and producer
- Mat Ferraro – producer

== Charts ==
Weekly chart performance for "Double Take"
Chart (2024)	Peak position
Malaysia International (RIM)	12
Philippines (Philippines Hot 100)	25

2024 year-end chart performance for "Double Take"
Chart (2024)	Position
Philippines (Philippines Hot 100)	57
