= Raeburn Park School =

School in Singapore

Location
- Raeburn Park, Singapore; Singapore; 1.2735°N 103.8316°E

Information
- Former name: Harbour Board School
- Type: International school
- Established: 1954
- Founder: Singapore Harbour Board officials
- Closed: 1981
- Houses: Keppel, Raffles, Ridley
- Colours: Yellow and brown

Raeburn Park School was established in 1954 by a group of Singapore Harbour Board officials who were concerned about the shortage of educational facilities for non-service expatriate children. The school was located at Raeburn Park in a Harbour Board property overlooking Singapore harbour; hence the school was also known as the Harbour Board School.

== History ==
Within 18 months the initial intake of 29 students had grown dramatically to a full-capacity school roll of 210 students. A house system was implemented and students were placed in one of the three houses: Keppel, Raffles or Ridley.

The management of the school was transferred to the British European Association (BEA - now known as the British Association of Singapore) in 1960. The BEA also managed Tanglin Preparatory School. Following Singapore's independence in 1965, the Harbour Board was replaced by The Port of Singapore Authority, which informed the school their lease would not be renewed after 1972. The school moved to Alexandra Park into the vacated Royal Army Ordnance Corps Mess and the adjoining cell block. The first overseas contracted teacher was appointed in 1973 although locally employed women, trained teachers from the UK, New Zealand or Australia. The same year a male Headteacher was employed and he was the first male member of staff. It was another two years before the first male teacher was appointed. In 1974 Raeburn Park came under management of Tanglin Trust Ltd which also managed Tanglin Preparatory and Weyhill Preparatory schools. The three schools were henceforth managed by one common Board of Governors.

In 1976 with the final withdrawal of British troops the school moved to Portsdown Road opposite Weyhill Preparatory School. Raeburn and Weyhill operated separately but shared the playing field between them. In 1981 Raeburn Park ceased to exist when it amalgamated with Tanglin Preparatory and Weyhill Preparatory Schools to form Tanglin Infant School and Tanglin Junior School.

== Head Teachers ==
- Muriel Mackay 1954 - 1971
- Lorna Bunnet 1971 - 1972
- Peter Gotts 1973 - 1976
- Brian Trott 1977 - 1979
- David Strachan 1979 - 1981

== Alumni ==
The school Alumni community stay in touch with each other and with the present day Tanglin Trust School.
