= Kang Jeong =

South Korean poet

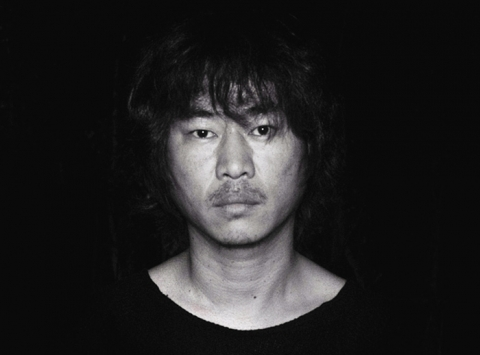
- Occupation: Writer
- Writing career
- Genre: Poetry

Kang Jeong (Korean: 강정; born 1971) is a South Korean poet. He was born in Busan, South Korea and studied creative writing at Chugye University for the Arts. He made his literary debut when six of his poems including "Hanggu" (항구 Port) appeared in the Fall 1992 issue of the journal Modern Poetry World. He was a lead vocalist for Chimso Band and a member of the band THE ASK.

== Biography ==
Kang Jeong debuted as a poet in 1992 at the age of 21, the youngest South Korean born in 1970 to have done so. In 1996, he completed his compulsory military service and published a poetry collection entitled Cheohyeonggeukjang (처형극장 Execution Theater). The collection was a critical and popular success, making Kang one of the most lauded young poets in the country. Literary critic and writer Ko Jong-seok praised the collection, saying: "To see a true work of aestheticism that risks being ridiculed, to meet a true believer in aestheticism who pleases his god not just by the purity of his faith but by the elegance of his rituals, the South Korean literary world had to wait for Kang's Cheohyeonggeukjang to arrive."

After Kang published his first poetry collection at the age of 26, he wrote various genres, including his 2004 collection of interviews, reviews, and essays in cultural criticism, entitled Ruteuwa kodeu (루트와 코드 Route and Code). Following this publication, Kang became better known as an essayist than as a poet. In his essays, as seen in Ruteuwa kodeu and many other works, Kang discusses a range of material from literature and art to film and music with perceptiveness and poetic sentiment.

Kang formed a literary coterie named Talsedae ("transcending generations") with writers Kim Yeonsu and Lee Eung Jun, and even dabbled in writing fiction. Kang, along with other South Korean poets born in the seventies who rose to prominence in the 2000s, was identified as a futurist. His reputation as a poet grew as he published a total of six poetry collections: Deulyeojureoni marira hetjiman (들려주려니 말이라 했지만, I've Called It Speech to Tell You about It But,) in 2006; Kis (키스 Kiss) in 2008; Hwal (활 Bow) in 2011; Gwisin (귀신 Ghost) in 2014; and Baekchiui sansu (백치의 산수 The Idiot's Arithmetic) in 2016. He won the 16th Weolgan Contemporary Poetry Award in 2015.

== Writing ==
In Kang's poems, there is often a tension between obsessive passion and the longing for absolute dispassion. The poet takes on human, animal, or ghostly personas and explores paradoxical themes of life and death, reality and fantasy, and chaos and civilization. These themes are conveyed through imagery such as "a silence bathed in blood" or "the words of Death."

Kang's first poetry collection Cheohyeonggeukjang (처형극장 Execution Theater) portrays a world of death and depravity, while his second collection Deulyeojureoni marira hetjiman (들려주려니 말이라 했지만, I've Called It Speech to Tell You about It But,) is filled with a sense of anticipation for new life. His third collection Kis (키스 Kiss) shows the poet maturing in his writing style, and his next work Hwal (활 Bow) compares language to an arrow aimed towards the silent world. Gwisin (귀신 Ghost) and Baekchiui sansu (백치의 산수 The Idiot's Arithmetic) are notable for their dynamic and unrestrained energy. The poet Lee Jun-kyu has described Kang as "one who is cursed and sorrowful, who spits blood and cries and can't help but love."

== Works ==
=== Poetry collections ===
1. 『처형극장』(문학과지성사, 1996) {Execution Theatre. Moonji, 1996.}

2. 『들려주려니 말이라 했지만,』(문학동네, 2006) {I've Called It a Horse to Tell You about It But,. Munhakdongne, 2006.}

3. 『키스』(문학과지성사, 2008) {Kiss. Moonji, 2008.}

4. 『활』(문예중앙, 2011) {Bow. Munye Joongang, 2011.}

5. 『귀신』(문학동네, 2014) {Ghost. Munhakdongne, 2014.}

6. 『백치의 산수』(민음사, 2016) {The Idiot's Arithmetic. Minumsa, 2016.}

=== Essay collections ===
1. 『루트와 코드』(샘터사, 2004) {Route and Code. Samtoh, 2004.}

2. 『나쁜 취향』(랜덤하우스코리아, 2006) {Bad Taste. Random House Korea, 2006.}

3. 『콤마, 씨』(문학동네, 2012) {Comma, Seed. Munhakdongne, 2012.}

=== Works in translation ===
1. Poetry in Ce lointain si proche: Anthologie 2015 (French)
2. AZALEA (Journal of Korean Literature & Culture) : Volume Eight (English)

=== Excerpt ===
==== Kiss ====
Closing the door, you kiss me. The door is narrow but the world inside the door is wide, Entering your door, I touch your heart, and the world my tongue touches bears pictures meandering like the traces of a snake. While I muse on the next shape of humanity, rain gradually mixes blue and yellow. The scene with trees opening hidden eyes is a moment when a fairy tale I read long ago becomes real. The future does not come by a shifting of time, it is a temporary conclusion by extinction of time, so inside your door, I compose a prophecy of the end everyone experiences. From my tongue, you try to absorb the laws of music and poetry. By you, I try to establish a prototype of beautiful breasts and a type of psychological incest. Therefore, this kiss is a contact of high-level play and strict secrecy unrelated to drug addiction. Your door is opened by my kiss and is eternally closed by my kiss. I am your last man. But for you I am the first man. Inside your door, finality is connected to the experience of extreme near-death. On your projecting teeth foregrounding an aesthetics of bloodsucking, a poetic line, 'the taste of a closing coffin-lid' had been written then erased. As the tongue shrinks slightly, an unhappy family history is drawn on my tongue.

- Translated by Chung Eun-Gwi and Brother Anthony of Taize, 2014 Seoul International Writers' Festival Anthology

== Awards ==
2015: 16th Weolgan Contemporary Poetry Award
