= DK (singer) =

South Korean singer (born 1997)

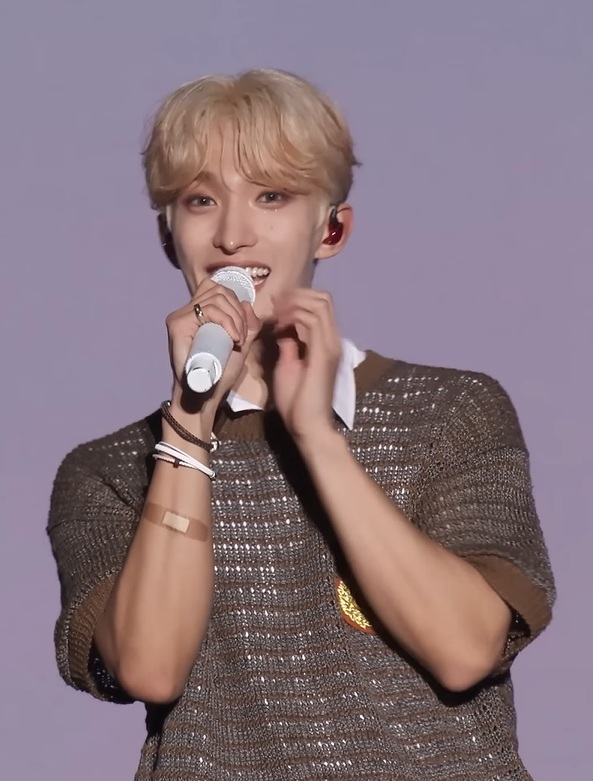
- DK in March 2024
- Born: Lee Seok-min; February 18, 1997 (age 29); Seoul, South Korea
- Other name: Dokyeom
- Occupations: Singer; actor
- Musical career
- Genre: K-pop
- Instrument: Vocals
- Years active: 2015–present
- Label: Pledis
- Member of: Seventeen; BSS; DxS

Korean name
- Hangul: 이석민
- RR: I Seokmin
- MR: I Sŏngmin

Stage name
- Hangul: 도겸
- Hanja: 道兼
- RR: Dogyeom
- MR: Togyŏm

Lee Seok-min (Korean: 이석민; born February 18, 1997), known professionally as Dokyeom (도겸) or DK, is a South Korean singer. Managed by Pledis Entertainment he is a member of the South Korean boy band Seventeen, its vocal team, and is the leader of its subunit BSS with Hoshi and Seungkwan.

Outside of his group activities, In 2019, DK made his musical theatre debut with the lead role Arthur in XCalibur, the South Korean production of Artus-Excalibur. He then returned to play the role of Arthur in XCalibur's 2021 run. DK has also released a number of OSTs that have been commercially successful in South Korea.

== Early life ==
DK was born on February 18, 1997, in Mapo District, Seoul, South Korea. He attended School of Performing Arts Seoul and graduated in 2016.

== Name ==
DK is the shortened version of his Korean stage name Dokyeom. In Korean, Do (도; 道) refers to a path or road, while Kyeom (겸; 兼) means "multitasker", together representing a goal to be a multi-talented person who can take on many paths.

== Career ==
=== 2011–2014: Pre-debut ===
DK joined Pledis Entertainment in late 2011, having auditioned for the company after being inspired by South Korean singer Yoon Do-hyun's career. He auditioned with three songs: YB Band's "Peppermint Candy", 2AM's "This Song", and the Korean version of "This Is the Moment" from the musical Jekyll & Hyde.

In 2013, he began appearing in Seventeen TV, an online reality show that introduced Pledis' trainees and showed potential members of the boy group Seventeen before their official debut. The show was broadcast periodically on Ustream, where the trainees showed themselves training, singing, creating choreographies, and playing games. The online show also included participation in concerts titled Like Seventeen.

=== 2015–present: Seventeen, solo and sub-unit activities ===
On May 29, 2015, DK debuted as a member of the South Korean boy group Seventeen with the extended play 17 Carat. Renowned for his vocal abilities, DK serves as a main vocalist for the group, and is a member of Seventeen's vocal team. Since the group's debut, DK has received songwriting credit for over ten of Seventeen's songs.

In 2018, DK, alongside Seventeen members Seungkwan and Hoshi, formed the group's first official subunit, BSS or BooSeokSoon (부석순), with DK acting as the trio's leader. BSS released their debut single "Just Do It" on March 21.

On February 28, 2019, DK was cast as Arthur, a leading role in the South Korean production of Artus-Excalibur titled Xcalibur at the Sejong Center, marking his debut as a musical actor. In anticipation for the role, he was featured on the cover of the performing arts magazine Scene Playbill. DK's performance received praise from critics and audiences. Jang Woo-young of Osen lauded his performance as "amazing", with the musical "announc[ing] the birth of a new musical star." Frank Wildhorn, the original composer of the musical, also commended his talent. For his work on the role, DK was nominated for the "Male Rookie Award" at the 4th Korea Musical Awards and "Musical Male Rookie" at the 2019 Stagetalk Audience Choice Awards Later that year, EMK Musical Company released an album of Xcalibur's live stage performances, which featured DK.

In 2021, DK reprised the role of Arthur in the second run of Xcalibur at the Blue Square Shinhan Card Hall in Seoul. In anticipation for his role in the re-run, he was featured on the magazine cover of Theatre Plus' August 2021 issue. Despite opening during the COVID-19 pandemic, the second season of the musical was recognized as a success, garnering standing ovations at every show and praises for DK's performance. In September 2022, the EMK Musical Company released a documentary titled Xcalibur the Musical Documentary: Dokyeom's Brilliant Journey (엑스칼리버 더 뮤지컬 다큐멘터리: 도겸의 찬란한 여정), highlighting DK's growth as a musical actor. On July 19, 2021, all members of Seventeen, including DK, renewed their contract with Pledis Entertainment.

In 2023, after a five-year hiatus, BSS returned with the single album Second Wind and song "Fighting", which both met commercial success. In May 2025, DK released "It's You" for the soundtrack of Resident Playbook.

In 2026, he and Seungkwan formed DxS, with a debut EP released in January.

== Artistry ==
=== Voice ===
DK has been commended for his singing prowess, both for his work in Seventeen and in musical theatre. In 2018, he was featured as one of the K-pop industry's "representative vocalists" by Dispatch Korea. In 2022, Newsen's Lee Seul-gi reported that DK has been recognized for his vocal skills, which display a wide range and rich volume. In reviewing Seventeen's Follow concert in Seoul, Abby Webster described his voice as a "warm lower register" for NME. After his appearance on King of Masked Singer, Park Hee-ah of Melon described his voice as having "solid vocalization, high range, and flexible rhythm."

=== Influences ===
DK has cited YB as being a major inspiration for his music career.

== Other endeavors ==
=== Skincare ambassadorships ===
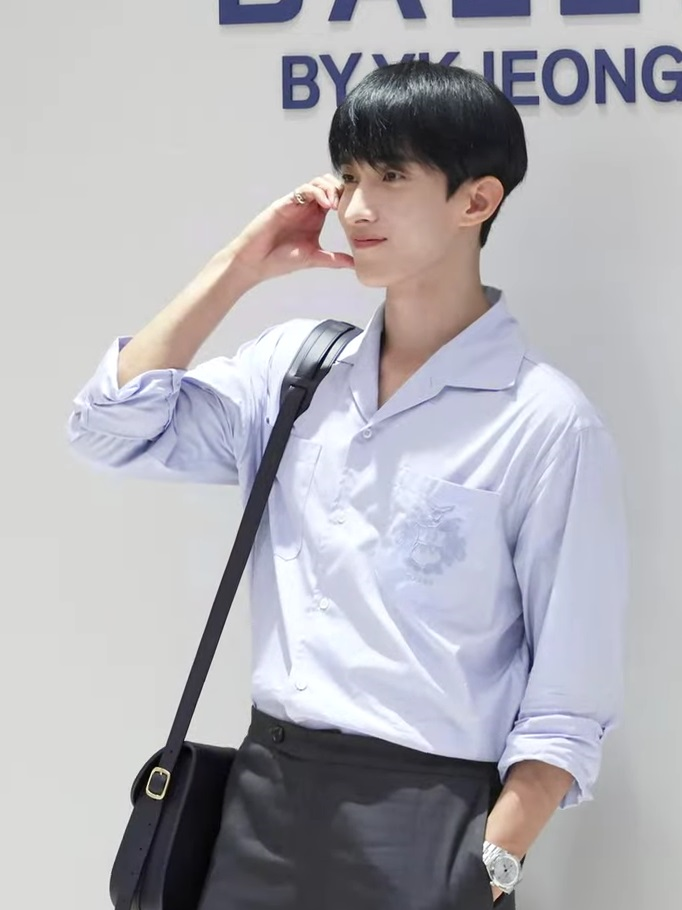
DK at a Bally event in 2024

On June 26, 2023, South Korean cosmetics brand S2nd revealed its latest collaboration, with DK and Seungkwan as their exclusive models. In 2025, he was selected as an ambassador for South Korean skincare brand AmpleN.

=== Fashion ===
On September 19, 2023, Swiss luxury fashion house Bally announced DK as its newest global brand ambassador. Prior to the announcement, he had made an exclusive appearance at the house's Fall/Winter 2023 Milan Fashion Week on February 25, 2023. Bally CEO Nicolas Girotto cited his versatility, fashionable demeanor, and amiable disposition as decisive elements in his appointment as the brand's latest global ambassador. DK commenced his global activities with Bally by participating in events such as the Bally Spring/Summer 2024 Collection at Milan Fashion Week on September 23, 2023, and the Bally Fall/Winter 2024 at Milan Fashion Week on February 26, 2024. He then appeared in Bally's 2024 Spring/Summer campaign.

In July 2025, he attended South Korean clothing brand Satur's store opening in Myeongdong, Seoul.

== Personal life ==
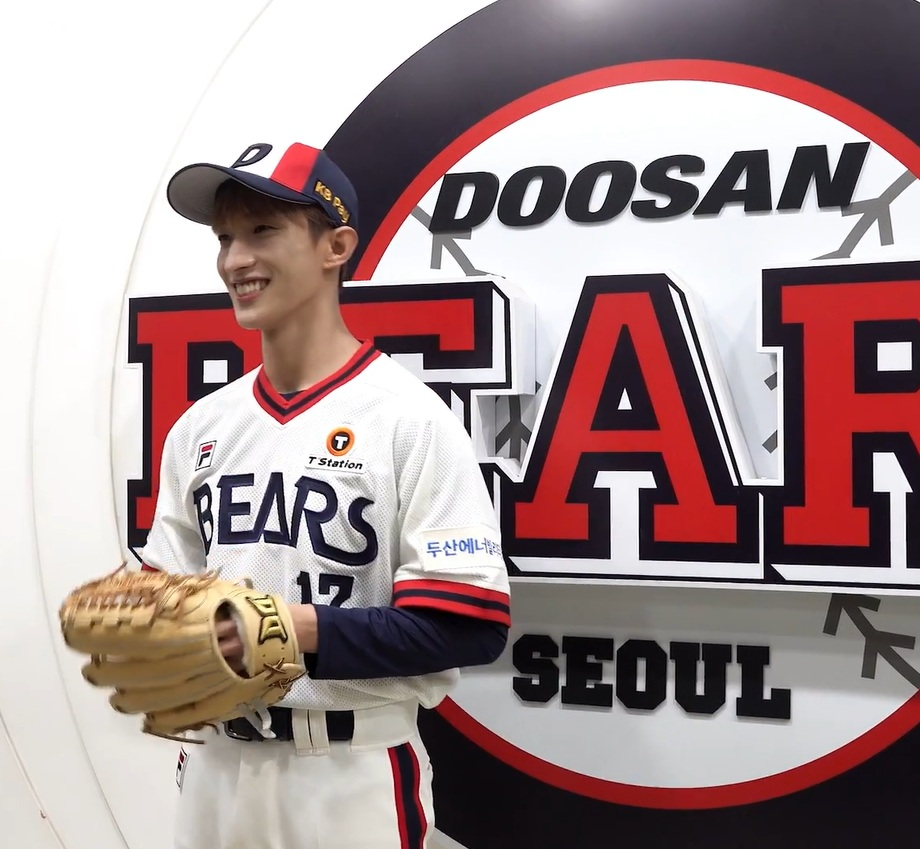
DK after throwing the ceremonial first pitch at a Doosan Bears game in July 2023

DK has been recognized by fans for his compassionate and empathetic nature, as showcased in an episode of a Dingo Story YouTube series titled "수고했어 오늘도" (translated: Good Job Today Too), released on February 13, 2023. In this episode, he personally prepared a lunch box for a fan, whom he shared a heartfelt conversation with about working hard in daily life.

Outside of his music career, DK is an avid sports enthusiast, enjoying activities like football, volleyball, baseball, and basketball. He has expressed particular interest in baseball, often expressing his support for the Doosan Bears. On April 2, 2023, DK was invited to throw the ceremonial first pitch at a Doosan Bears game. In January 2025, he met with South Korea's 2008 Olympics Baseball Squad on SBS' Tail to Tail Story. In January 2025, DK also revealed that he was playing for an amateur baseball club.

== Discography ==
=== Singles ===
Title	Year	Peak chart positions	Album
Title	Year	KOR	Album
"Cinematic Love" (한 편의 너) with Yang Da-il	2018	88	Non-album singles
"17" (Remix) Pink Sweat$ featuring Joshua & DK	2020	—	Non-album singles
"You're My Christmas"	2021	—	Non-album singles
"Die Schatten Werden Laenger" Kai with DK	2022	—	Kai on Musical
"Dirty Dancing" (Dem Jointz Remix) New Kids on the Block featuring Joshua, DK & Dino	2023	—	The Block Revisited
"—" denotes releases that did not chart or were not released in that region.

=== Other charted songs ===
Title	Year	Peak chart positions	Album
Title	Year	KOR	Album
"Happy Virus" (Note: Credited under Seventeen but is a solo track performed by DK.)	2025	114	Happy Burstday
"Rockstar" (Note: Credited under DxS but is a solo track performed by DK.)	2026	138	Serenade

=== Soundtrack appearances ===
Title	Year	Peak chart positions		Album
Title	Year	KOR	KOR Hot	Album
"Fate" (인연) original by Lee Seung Chul	2016	— (Note: "Fate" did not enter the Circle Digital Chart, but peaked at number 95 on the Circle BGM Chart.)	—	Mask Singer 70th (Live Version)
"Downfall of the Moon" (달의 몰락) original by Kim Hyun Chul	2016	—	—	Mask Singer 70th (Live Version)
"Missed Connections" (내가 먼저)	2018	— (Note: "Missed Connections" did not enter the Gaon Digital Chart, but peaked at number 39 on the Gaon BGM Chart.)	—	Tempted OST
"My Flesh, My Blood, My Skin, My Bones" (난 나의 것)	2019	—	—	Xcalibur Musical 2019 OST
"Let the Sword Make This Man" (검이 한 사람을) with Um Ki-Joon, Xcalibur Ensemble, Knights	2019	—	—	Xcalibur Musical 2019 OST
"Remember This Night" (기억해 이 밤) with Son Jun Ho, Xcalibur Ensemble	2019	—	—	Xcalibur Musical 2019 OST
"Go It Alone" (혼자서 가) with Lee Ji Hoon	2019	—	—	Xcalibur Musical 2019 OST
"Murmur of the Heart" (심장의 침묵)	2019	—	—	Xcalibur Musical 2019 OST
"Eye For an Eye Reprise" (눈에는 눈 리프라이즈) with Lee Sang Jun, Xcalibur Ensemble, Bride, Saxons	2019	—	—	Xcalibur Musical 2019 OST
"In Troubled Times Like These" (이렇게 우리 만난 건) with Min Kyung Ah	2019	—	—	Xcalibur Musical 2019 OST
"What Does It Mean to be a King" (왕이 된다는 것)	2019	—	—	Xcalibur Musical 2019 OST
"Is It Still Beautiful" (여전히 아름다운지) with Woozi and Seungkwan, originally by Kim Yeon-woo	2021	25	22	Hospital Playlist OST Part 8
"Go!"	2022	123	88	Twenty-Five Twenty-One OST
"Short Hair" (단발머리)	2023	— (Note: "Short Hair" did not enter the Circle Digital Chart, but peaked at number 116 on the Circle Downloads Chart, and at number 34 on the Circle BGM Chart.)	—	Welcome to Samdal-ri OST
"See the World" with Seungkwan and Bleeding Fingers Music	2024	—	—	Asia OST
"It's You" (너인데)	2025	— (Note: "It's You" did not enter the Circle Digital Chart, but peaked at number 20 on the Circle BGM Chart, and at number 32 on the Circle Download Chart.)	—	Resident Playbook OST
"—" denotes releases that did not chart or were not released in that region.

== Composition credits ==
All credits are adapted from the Korea Music Copyright Association except where noted.

Year	Artist	Song	Album	Lyrics		Music		Ref.
Year	Artist	Song	Album	Credited	With	Credited	With	Ref.
2016	Seventeen	"Say Yes"	Love & Letter	Yes	Woozi, Seungkwan, Kiggen	No	—N/a	
2016	Seventeen	"Adore U" (아낀다) (Vocal Team)	Love & Letter	Yes	Bumzu, S.Coups, Woozi, Vernon, Seungkwan	No	—N/a	
2017	Seventeen	"Without You" (모자를 눌러 쓰고)	Teen, Age	Yes	Woozi, Vernon, Jeonghan, Hoshi, The8, Mingyu, S.Coups, Dino, Bumzu	No	—N/a	
2017	Seventeen	"Clap" (박수)	Teen, Age	Yes	Bumzu, Woozi, Hoshi, Mingyu, Jeonghan, Seungkwan	No	—N/a	
2017	Seventeen	"Hello"	Teen, Age	Yes	Bumzu, Mingyu, Jun	Yes	Bumzu	
2017	Seventeen	"Campfire" (캠프파이어)	Teen, Age	Yes	Woozi, Vernon, Jeonghan, Wonwoo, The8, Mingyu, S.Coups, Seungkwan, Bumzu	No	—N/a	
2017	Seventeen	"We gonna make it shine"	Non-album singles	Yes	Bumzu, Woozi, Joshua, Seungkwan, Jeonghan	No	—N/a	
2019	BSS	"Just Do It" (거침없이)	Non-album singles	Yes	Woozi, Hoshi, Seungkwan	No	—N/a	
2020	Seventeen	"Hey Buddy"	Semicolon	Yes	Bumzu, Woozi, Mingyu, The8	Yes	Bumzu, Woozi, Mingyu, The8, Lee Gi-yong, Lee Min-gyu	
2021	Seventeen	"In the Soop"	Non-album singles	Yes	Woozi, Wonwoo, Dino, Hoshi, Mingyu, Joshua, Jeonghan	No	—N/a	
2021	DK	"You're My Christmas"	Non-album singles	Yes	Jozu, Lee Beom-hoon	Yes	Jozu, Lee Beom-hoon	
2023	BSS	"Fighting" (파이팅 해야지); Featuring Lee Young-ji	Second Wind	Yes	Bumzu, Woozi, Hoshi, Seungkwan, Lee Young-ji	No	—N/a	
2023	BSS	"Lunch"	Second Wind	Yes	Bumzu, Woozi, Hoshi, Seungkwan	No	—N/a	
2023	BSS	"7PM" (7시예 들어줘); Featuring Peder Elias	Second Wind	Yes	Bumzu, Woozi, Hoshi, Seungkwan, Peder Elias	No	—N/a	
2025	BSS	"CBZ (Prime Time)" (청바지)	Teleparty	Yes	Bumzu, Woozi, Hoshi, Seungkwan	No	—N/a	
2025	BSS	"Happy Alone"	Teleparty	Yes	Bumzu, Woozi, Hoshi, Seungkwan	No	—N/a	
2025	BSS	"Love Song" (사랑 노래)	Teleparty	Yes	Bumzu, Woozi, Hoshi, Seungkwan	No	—N/a	
2025	Seventeen	"Encircled" (동그라미)	Non-album singles	Yes	Woozi, S.Coups, Joshua, Jun, Hoshi, Wonwoo, The8, Mingyu, Seungkwan, Vernon, Dino	No	—N/a	
2025	Seventeen	"Happy Virus"	Happy Burstday	Yes	Woozi	No	—N/a	

== Filmography ==
=== Film ===
Year	Title	Role	Ref.
Xcalibur the Musical Documentary: Dokyeom's Brilliant Journey	2022	Himself	

=== Television shows ===
TV shows featuring DK's solo appearances, showing year, remarks, and notes
Title	Year	Notes	Ref.
King of Masked Singer	2016	"Dream" (with Jihyo of Twice)	
King of Masked Singer	2016	"Downfall of the Moon" (달의 몰락) and "Fate" (인연)	
Stars' Top Recipe at Fun-Staurant	2020	Special MC	
My Remaining Love (working title)	2026	Cast member	

=== Music video appearances ===
Title	Year	Artist	Notes	Ref.
"My Copycat"	2014	Orange Caramel	Pre-debut	
"Side by Side"	2021	The8		

== Awards and nominations ==
Award	Year	Category	Nominee/Works	Result	Ref
Korea Musical Awards	2020	Male Rookie Award	Xcalibur	Nominated	
Stagetalk Audience Choice Awards	2019	Musical Male Rookie	Xcalibur	Nominated	
