= Seungkwan =

South Korean singer (born 1998)

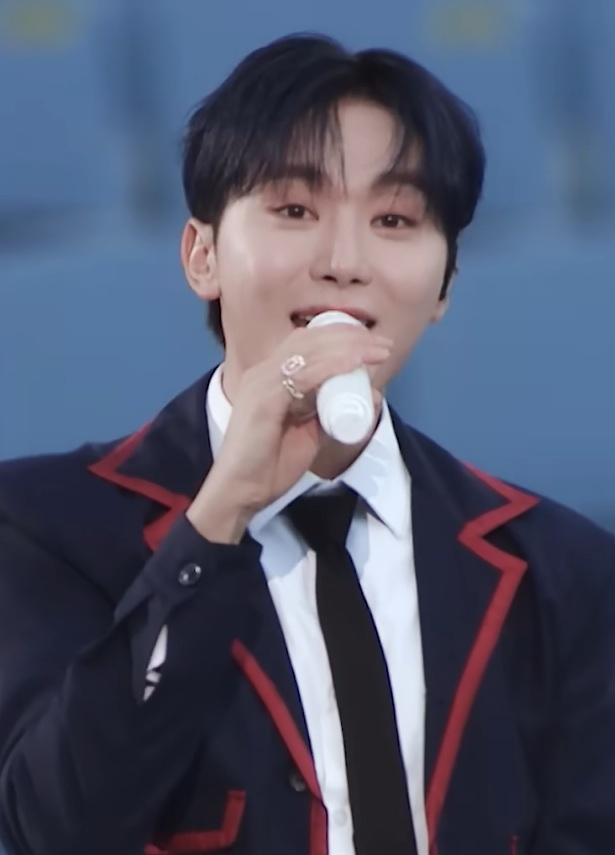
- Seungkwan in March 2025
- Born: Boo Seung-kwan; January 16, 1998 (age 28); Busan, South Korea
- Occupation: Singer
- Musical career
- Genre: K-pop
- Instrument: Vocals
- Years active: 2015–present
- Label: Pledis
- Member of: Seventeen; BSS; DxS

Korean name
- Hangul: 부승관
- RR: Bu Seunggwan
- MR: Pu Sŭnggwan

Boo Seung-kwan (Korean: 부승관; born January 16, 1998), known mononymously as Seungkwan, is a South Korean singer. Managed by Pledis Entertainment, he is a member of the South Korean boy band Seventeen, its vocal team, and the subunit BSS alongside Hoshi and DK.

Apart from his group's activities, Seungkwan is known as an entertainment figure for his active participation in Korean variety shows such as Unexpected Q, Prison Life of Fools, and The Devil's Plan. Seungkwan has also released a number of OSTs that have been commercially successful in South Korea.

== Early life ==
Boo Seung-kwan was born in Busan, South Korea on January 16, 1998, but raised in Jeju, South Korea. Growing up, he participated in children's songs festivals held at his school, where a teacher recorded him singing and posted it online. The video later led to Seungkwan being cast at Pledis Entertainment in June 2012. At the age of 15, Seungkwan moved from Jeju to Seoul, where he attended Seoul Broadcasting High School and graduated in 2016.

== Career ==
=== 2015–present: Seventeen, solo and sub-unit activities ===
Seungkwan debuted as a member of the South Korean boy band, Seventeen with the extended play 17 Carat on May 26, 2015. In 2018, he released the single "Kind of Love" for the soundtrack of the series Mother. The song portrays a sorrowful love story with an acoustic sound.

Alongside bandmates Hoshi and DK, Seungkwan created a subunit of Seventeen called BSS, or BooSeokSoon, a common nickname for the three members together. The group released their debut single "Just Do It" on March 21. That same year, Seungkwan was cast in the talk show Unexpected Q. He was awarded the "Rookie (Music and Talk)" award at the 2018 MBC Entertainment Awards.

In 2019, Seungkwan was cast in Prison Life of Fools and in the talk show Five Cranky Brothers. On September 7, 2020, Seungkwan released the single "Go" for the soundtrack of the series Record of Youth. On January 29, 2021, Seungkwan participated in the soundtrack for the series Lovestruck in the City with a song titled "The Reason".

In 2021, Seungkwan was cast in the SM C&C television show Job Dongsan, alongside Kang Ho-dong and Super Junior's Eunhyuk, and in TVING's Idol Dictation Contest. Later, he appeared on tvN's new badminton television show Racket Boys, alongside Olympic champion Oh Sang-uk, Jang Sung-kyu, Yang Se-chan among others.

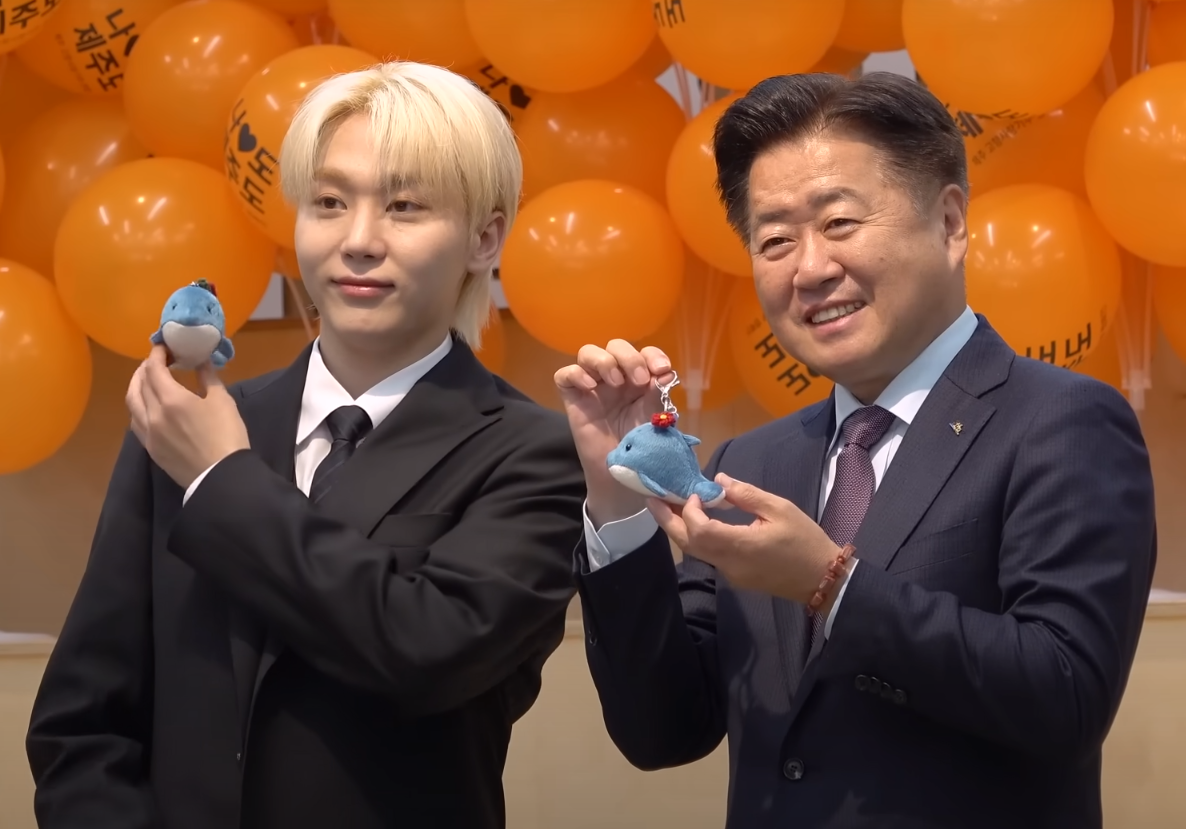
Seungkwan in 2024 with Jeju Governor Oh Young-hun

In January 2022, he was awarded the "Male Idol Entertainer" award at the 2022 Korea First Brand Awards, having been nominated in an earlier year. In September, he released a cover of Harry Styles' "As It Was" as an exclusive for Spotify Singles. In July 2023, Seungkwan went on a health-related hiatus and returned to activities in September that year ahead of the release of Seventeenth Heaven. In September 2023, the Netflix reality show The Devil's Plan was released, with Seungkwan having filmed it prior to his hiatus.

In February 2024, Seungkwan released his first solo single titled "Dandelion". In March he went on to release "Lonely Stars" for the Astra: Knights of Veda OST. On November 19, 2024, Seungkwan was made an honorary ambassador for Jeju Island, his hometown.

In February 2025, he released "Somewhere in this Universe" for the OST of When the Stars Gossip. On May 17, as a long-time volleyball fan, Seungkwan was featured as a guest commentator for Kim Yeon-koung's final volleyball match, titled "KYK Invitational". In September 2025, it was announced that Seungkwan joined Kim for MBC's new variety show The Wonder Coach, as team manager.

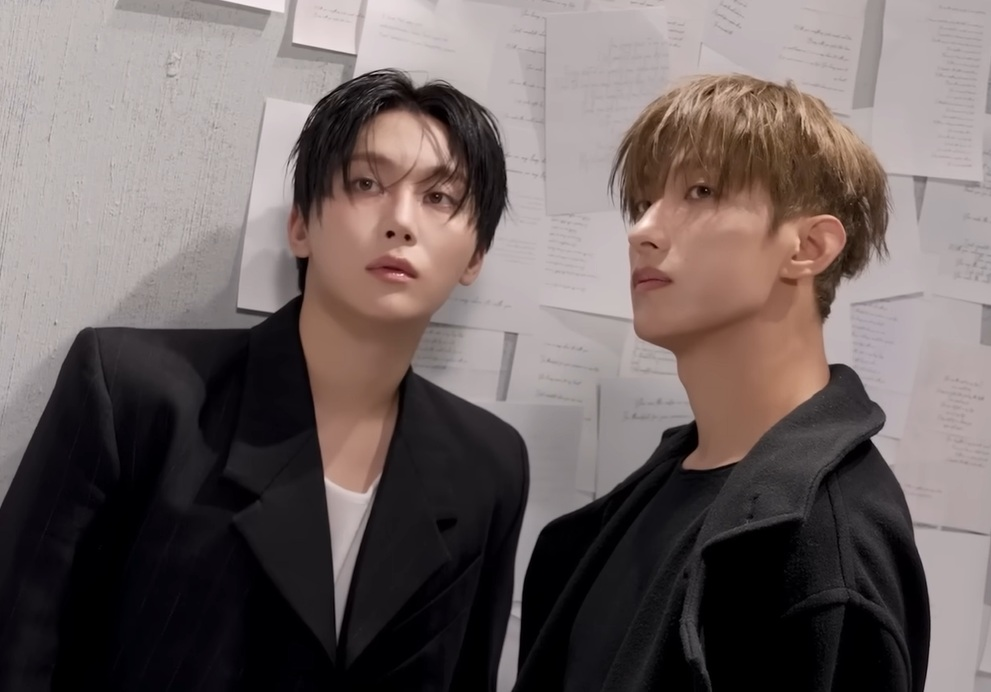
Seungkwan with DK for DxS

In January 2026, he and DK debuted as DK X Seungkwan with EP titled Serenade.

== Other ventures ==
=== Fashion and endorsements ===
In May 2022, Seungkwan, alongside bandmate Joshua, was announced as a model for Laneige's "Neo Cushion" line. In June 2023, Seungkwan began working with South Korean ice cream brand Bravo Cone from Haitai Confectionery. In May 2025, table tennis athlete Shin Yu-bin joined Seungkwan in a commercial for the brand.

In March 2024, he was announced as the muse of South Korean skincare brand FoRest. In September 2024, Seungkwan attended French fashion brand Louboutin's Spring/Summer 2025 show at Paris Fashion Week. He then collaborated with South Korean clothing brand Phyps for the same season, featuring in a pictorial that launched in February 2025.

== Filmography ==
=== Television shows ===
Year	Title	Role	Ref.
2018	Unexpected Q	Cast member	
2019	Prison Life of Fools	Cast member	
2019	Five Cranky Brothers	Cast member	
2021	Job Dongsan (Job Estate)	Cast member	
2021	Racket Boys	Cast member	
2025	Wonder Coach	Team manager	

=== Web shows ===
Year	Title	Role	Ref.
2021	Idol Dictation Contest	Cast member	
2023	The Devil's Plan	Cast member	
2025–present	Bi-Ba-Boo (비바부)	Host	

== Discography ==
=== Singles ===
List of singles, showing year released, chart positions, and album name
Title	Year	Peak chart positions	Album
Title	Year	KOR	Album
"Dandelion" (민들레)	2024	190	Non-album single

=== Other charted songs ===
Title	Year	Peak chart positions	Album
Title	Year	KOR	Album
"Raindrops" (Note: Credited under Seventeen but is a solo track performed by Seungkwan.)	2025	99	Happy Burstday

=== Soundtrack appearances ===
Title	Year	Peak chart positions			Album
Title	Year	KOR	KOR Hot	JPN Hot	Album
"How Love Is" (어떻게 사랑이 그래요) Duet with Lee Ji-yong, original by Lee Seung-hwan	2016	—	—	—	Duet Song Festival 11th
"With You" (어깨) Duet with Ahn Sol-bin, original by Soyou and Kwon Jeong-yeol	2018	—	—	—	Mask Singer 135th
"Sorry" (연) original by Big Mama	2018	—	—	—	Mask Singer 136th
"Kind of Love"	2018	—	—	—	Mother OST
"Go"	2020	— (Note: "Reason" did not enter the Circle Digital Chart, but peaked at number 103 on the Circle Downloads Chart.)	—	—	Record of Youth OST
"Reason"	2021	— (Note: "Reason" did not enter the Circle Digital Chart, but peaked at number 62 on the Circle Downloads Chart.)	—	—	Lovestruck in the City OST
"Is It Still Beautiful" (여전히 아름다운지) With Woozi and DK, originally by Kim Yeon-woo	2021	25	22	—	Hospital Playlist OST
"Pit a Pat"	2022	—	—	—	Link: Eat, Love, Kill OST
"Betting" With Shingo Katori, Jeonghan and Mingyu	2023	—	—	31	War of Traps OST
"Still You"	2023	— (Note: "Still You" did not enter the Circle Digital Chart, but peaked at number 48 on the Circle Downloads Chart.)	—	—	Dr. Romantic Season 3 OST
"The Moment You Arrive"	2023	— (Note: "The Moment You Arrive" did not enter the Circle Digital Chart, but peaked at number 24 on the Circle Downloads Chart.)	—	—	Tell Me That You Love Me OST
"Lonely Stars"	2024	— (Note: "Lonely Stars" did not enter the Circle Digital Chart, but the Korean version peaked at number 87 on the Circle Downloads Chart.)	—	—	Astra: Knights of Veda OST
"See the World" With DK and Bleeding Fingers Music	2024	—	—	—	Asia OST
"Somewhere in this Universe"	2025	— (Note: "Somewhere in this Universe" did not enter the Circle Digital Chart, but peaked at number 64 on the Circle Downloads Chart.)	—	—	When the Stars Gossip OST
"—" denotes releases that did not chart or were not released in that region.

=== Composition credits ===
All credits are adapted from the Korea Music Copyright Association unless stated otherwise.

Year	Artist	Song	Album	Lyrics		Music		Ref.
Year	Artist	Song	Album	Credited	With	Credited	With	Ref.
2016	Seventeen	"Pretty U" (예쁘다)	Love & Letter	Yes	Woozi, Bumzu, S.Coups, Vernon	No	—N/a	
2016	Seventeen	"Still Lonely" (이놈의 인기); Performed by Jun, Hoshi, Wonwoo, Woozi, DK, Vernon, Dino	Love & Letter	Yes	Woozi, Vernon, Wonwoo, Hoshi	No	—N/a	
2016	Seventeen	"Say Yes"; Performed by DK, Seungkwan	Love & Letter	Yes	Kiggen, Woozi, DK	No	—N/a	
2016	Seventeen	"Drift Away" (떠내려가); Performed by S.Coups, Jeonghan, Joshua, Mingyu, The8, Seungkwan	Love & Letter	Yes	Woozi, S.Coups, Mingyu, Hoshi	No	—N/a	
2016	Seventeen	"Adore U" (아낀다); Vocal Team version	Love & Letter	Yes	Woozi, Bumzu, DK, Vernon, S.Coups	No	—N/a	
2016	Seventeen	"No F.U.N"	Love & Letter Repackage Album	Yes	Woozi, S.Coups, Hoshi, Wonwoo, Vernon, Dino	No	—N/a	
2017	Seventeen	"Clap" (박수)	Teen, Age	Yes	Woozi, Vernon, Jeonghan, Hoshi, Mingyu, DK, Bumzu	No	—N/a	
2017	Seventeen	"Flower"; Performed by S.Coups, Seungkwan, Wonwoo, The8, Jeonghan, Dino	Teen, Age	Yes	S.Coups, Wonwoo, The8, Dino, Jeonghan, Woozi, Bumzu	No	—N/a	
2017	Seventeen	"Campfire" (캠프파이어)	Teen, Age	Yes	Woozi, Vernon, S.Coups, Jeonghan, Wonwoo, The8, Mingyu, DK, Bumzu	No	—N/a	
2018	Seventeen	We Gonna Make It Shine	Non-album single	Yes	Woozi, Bumzu, Jeonghan, Joshua, DK	No	—N/a	
2019	Seventeen	"Home"	You Made My Dawn	No	—N/a	Yes	Woozi, Bumzu	
2019	Seventeen	"Lucky"	An Ode	Yes	Woozi, Bumzu, Vernon, S.Coups, Mingyu	No	—N/a	
2020	Seventeen	"Home;Run"	Semicolon	Yes	Woozi, Bumzu, Vernon	No	—N/a	
2020	Seventeen	"Do Re Mi" (도레미); Performed by Seungkwan, Vernon, Dino	Semicolon	Yes	Woozi, Bumzu, Vernon, Dino	Yes	Woozi, Bumzu, Vernon, Poptime	
2020	Seventeen	"All My Love"	Semicolon	Yes	Woozi, Bumzu, Vernon	No	—N/a	
2023	BSS	"Fighting" (파이팅 해야지); Feat. Lee Young-ji	Second Wind	Yes	Woozi, Bumzu, Hoshi, DK, Lee Young-ji	No	—N/a	
2023	BSS	"Lunch"	Second Wind	Yes	Woozi, Bumzu, Hoshi, DK	No	—N/a	
2023	BSS	"7PM" (7시예 들어줘); Feat. Peder Elias	Second Wind	No	—N/a	Yes	Woozi, Bumzu, Peder Elias, Hoshi, DK	
2024	Seungkwan	Dandelion (민들레)	Non-album single	Yes	Choi Yu Ree	Yes	Choi Yu Ree	
2025	BSS	"CBZ (Prime Time)" (청바지)	Teleparty	Yes	Woozi, Bumzu, Hoshi, DK	No	—N/a	
2025	BSS	"Happy Alone"	Teleparty	Yes	Woozi, Bumzu, Hoshi, DK	No	—N/a	
2025	BSS	"Love Song" (사랑 노래)	Teleparty	Yes	Woozi, Bumzu, Hoshi, DK	No	—N/a	
2025	Seventeen	"Raindrops"	Happy Burstday	Yes	Ha Hyeonsang	Yes	Ha Hyeonsang	

== Awards and nominations ==
Name of the award ceremony, year presented, category, nominee of the award, and the result of the nomination
Award ceremony	Year	Category	Nominee/Work	Result	Ref.
Korea First Brand Awards (Note: Hosted by the Korea Consumer Brand Committee and supervised by the Korea Consumer Forum, the Korea First Brand Awards selects promising brands that will lead the year and bases its winners on consumption trend analysis, extensive nationwide consumer surveys, and evaluation and deliberation by experts.)	2019	Male Idol Entertainer	Boo Seung-kwan	Nominated	
Korea First Brand Awards	2022	Male Idol Entertainer	Boo Seung-kwan	Won	
MBC Entertainment Awards	2018	Rookie Award (Music and Talk)	King of Mask Singer, Unexpected Q	Won	
MBC Entertainment Awards	2025	Hot Issue Award	Wonder Coach	Won	
