= BSS (band) =

South Korean trio

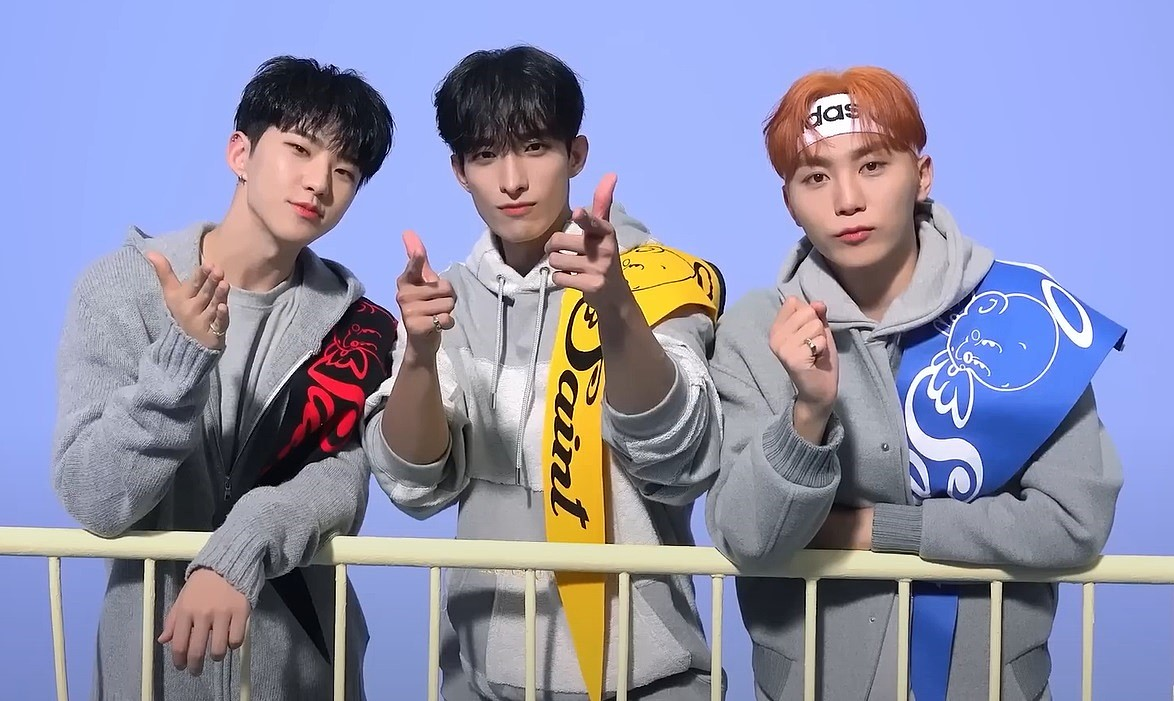
- BSS in February 2023; From left to right: Hoshi, DK, and Seungkwan

Background information
- Also known as: BooSeokSoon
- Origin: Seoul, South Korea
- Genres: K-pop
- Years active: 2018; 2023–present
- Label: Pledis
- Spinoffs: DxS
- Spinoff of: Seventeen
- Members: DK; Hoshi; Seungkwan

Korean name
- Hangul: 부석순
- RR: Buseoksun
- MR: Pusŏksun

BSS (Korean: 부석순; also known as BooSeokSoon or Seventeen BSS) is the first sub-unit of South Korean boy band Seventeen. Formed in 2018, the group is composed of DK, Hoshi, and Seungkwan.

The group is considered one of the most successful sub-units in K-pop, with their single "Fighting" garnering multiple nominations and awards for Song of the Year in 2023, and their debut single album Second Wind breaking the first-week sales record for an album released by a sub-unit. The group have also been selected as ambassadors for multiple brands, and in 2024, "Fighting" was selected as the official cheer song for the South Korean team at the Paris Olympics.

== Name ==
BSS is an acronym that stands for BooSeokSoon, a combination of a syllable from each of the band members' names: "Boo" from Boo Seungkwan, "Seok" from Lee Seokmin (DK), and "Soon" from Kwon Soonyoung (Hoshi). The name was coined by fans during the members' training period, prior to their official debut as Seventeen.

== History ==
=== 2018: Formation and debut ===
On February 2, 2018, DK, Hoshi, and Seungkwan performed an unreleased song, "Just Do It", at a Seventeen fan meeting as a special one-time skit. Following the performance, the fans' enthusiastic reaction prompted the formation of the trio as Seventeen's first official sub-unit, BSS. The group debuted on March 21, 2018, officially releasing "Just Do It" as a digital single.

=== 2023–present: Second Wind and Teleparty ===
In January 2023, almost five years after their debut, BSS announced they would be releasing an album. The group released their first single album Second Wind on February 6, 2023, alongside the music video for its lead single, "Fighting", featuring Lee Young-ji. The album includes two other tracks, "Lunch" and "7PM", with the latter featuring Norwegian artist Peder Elias. On the first day of its release, Second Wind sold over 478,000 copies, breaking the first-week sales record for an album released by a K-pop band sub-unit. By the end of the first week, the album sold a record 610,189 copies in total. On February 15, 2023, BSS received their first music show win on MBC M's Show Champion with "Fighting", followed by wins on M Countdown, Music Bank, Show! Music Core and Inkigayo. Following the success of their promotions, BSS won the Best Performance of the Year category at the 2023 Asia Artist Awards, earning themselves their first daesang (grand prize) award.

On March 10, 2024, BSS released the single "The Reasons of My Smiles" as part of the original soundtrack of the series Queen of Tears. On December 27, it was announced that BSS would be releasing their second single album Teleparty, alongside its lead single "CBZ (Prime Time)" on January 8, 2025.

== Other ventures ==
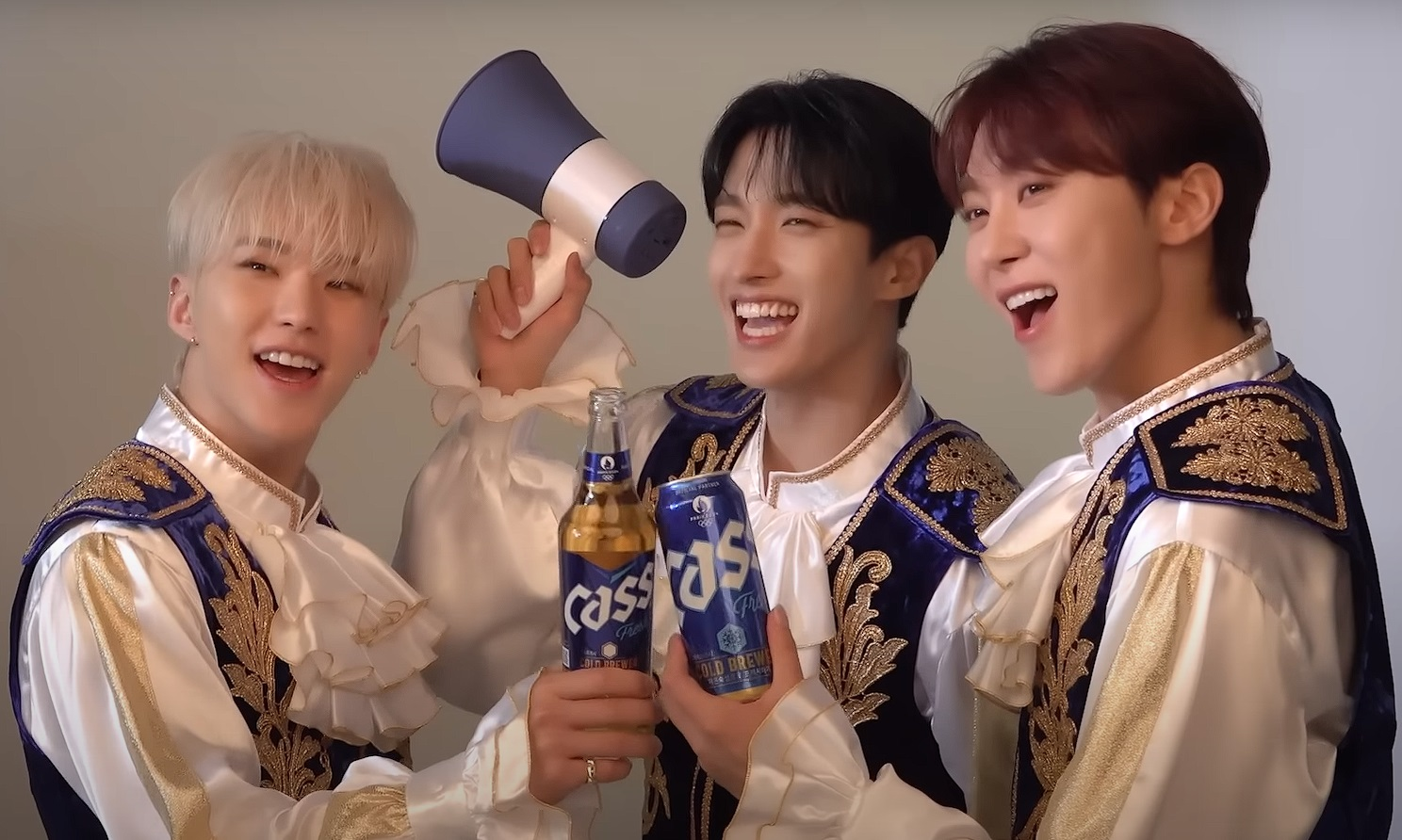
BSS for Cass in 2024

On February 13, 2022, BSS was selected as the brand ambassador of skincare brand Bring Green. In March 2024, BSS was appointed as Oppo Reno Experts, serving as the face of Oppo's campaign to launch the Oppo Reno11 F 5G smartphone into the Asia-Pacific market. On June 24, South Korean beer brand Cass, an official partner of the 2024 Paris Olympics, announced BSS as the models of its summer digital campaign "Cheers Sound". The group's song "Fighting" was also selected as the official cheer song for the South Korean team at the Paris Olympics.

== Members ==
- DK – leader
- Hoshi
- Seungkwan

== Discography ==
=== Single albums ===
List of single albums, showing selected details, selected chart positions, sales figures, and certifications
Title	Details	Peak chart positions							Sales	Certifications
Title	Details	KOR	BEL (FL)	BEL (WAL)	GER	JPN	PRT	SWI	Sales	Certifications
Second Wind	Released: February 6, 2023; Label: Pledis; Formats: CD, digital download, streaming	1	180	76	76	3	7	88	KOR: 756,410; JPN: 54,848	KMCA: 2× Platinum
Teleparty	Released: January 8, 2025; Label: Pledis; Formats: CD, digital download, streaming	1	—	—	—	2	—	—	KOR: 683,932; JPN: 63,045	KMCA: Platinum
"—" denotes releases that did not chart or were not released in that region.

=== Singles ===
List of singles, showing year released, selected chart positions, and name of the album
Title	Year	Peak chart position					Certifications	Album
Title	Year	KOR	KOR Songs	JPN Hot	NZ Hot	US World	Certifications	Album
"Just Do It" (거침없이)	2018	167	—	—	—	—		Non-album single
"Fighting" (파이팅 해야지) (featuring Lee Young-ji)	2023	5	5	1	—	8	KMCA: Platinum (Note: Certification for streaming); RIAJ: Gold (Note: Certification for streaming)	Second Wind
"CBZ (Prime Time)" (청바지)	2025	22	—	5	40	10		Teleparty
"—" denotes releases that did not chart or were not released in that region.

=== Soundtrack appearances ===
Title	Year	Peak chart positions	Album
Title	Year	KOR	Album
"The Reasons of My Smiles" (자꾸만 웃게 돼)	2024	93	Queen of Tears OST
"Good Day 2025 (Telepathy + By the Moonlight Window)" (굿데이 2025 (텔레파시 + 달빛 창가에서)) (G-Dragon featuring Hwang Jung-min, Defconn, Hong Jin-kyung, Jung Hyung-don, Jo Se-ho, Kian84, Anh Sung-jae, Taeyang, Jung Hae-in, Hwang Kwang-hee, Yim Si-wan, Lee Soo-hyuk, Daesung, Code Kunst, CL, Kim Go-eun, Day6, BSS, and Aespa)	2025	21	Good Day OST

=== Other charted songs ===
List of other charted songs, showing year released, selected chart positions, and name of the album
Title	Year	Peak chart position	Album
Title	Year	KOR	Album
"Lunch"	2023	65	Second Wind
"7PM" (7시에 들어줘) (featuring Peder Elias)	2023	49	Second Wind
"Happy Alone"	2025	121	Teleparty
"Love Song" (사랑 노래)	2025	127	Teleparty

== Videography ==
=== Music videos ===
Title	Year	Director(s)	Ref.
"Just Do It"	2018	Unknown	
"Fighting"	2023	Bang Jaeyeob (Bang Jaeyeob Film)	
"CBZ (Prime Time)"	2025	Hattrick	

== Awards and nominations ==
Name of the award ceremony, year presented, category, nominee(s) of the award, and the result of the nomination
Award ceremony	Year	Category	Nominee(s)	Result	Ref.
Asia Artist Awards	2023	Performance of the Year (Daesang)	BSS	Won	
Asian Pop Music Awards (Note: Hosted by the Hong Kong Asia Pacific International Group and Sunway Records, the Asian Pop Music Awards bases its winners on the "Asian Pop Music Chart" which opened in September 2019.)	2023	Top 20 Songs of the Year – Overseas	"Fighting" (featuring Lee Young-ji)	Won	
Asian Pop Music Awards	2023	Best Collaboration	"Fighting" (featuring Lee Young-ji)	Won	
Asian Pop Music Awards	2023	People's Choice Award – Overseas	BSS	3rd place	
Brand of the Year Awards	2023	Best Unit	BSS	Won	
Golden Disc Awards	2024	Digital Daesang (Song of the Year)	"Fighting" (featuring Lee Young-ji)	Nominated	
Golden Disc Awards	2024	Digital Bonsang	"Fighting" (featuring Lee Young-ji)	Won	
MAMA Awards	2018	Song of the Year	"Just Do It"	Nominated	
MAMA Awards	2018	Best Unit	BSS	Nominated	
MAMA Awards	2023	Song of the Year	"Fighting" (featuring Lee Young-ji)	Nominated	
MAMA Awards	2023	Best Collaboration	"Fighting" (featuring Lee Young-ji)	Nominated	
Melon Music Awards	2023	Top 10 Artist	BSS	Nominated	
Melon Music Awards	2023	Millions Top 10	BSS	Won	
Melon Music Awards	2023	Best Male Group	BSS	Nominated	
Melon Music Awards	2023	Song of the Year	"Fighting" (featuring Lee Young-ji)	Nominated	
Melon Music Awards	2025	Millions Top 10	Teleparty	Nominated	
Seoul Drama Awards	2024	Outstanding OST	"The Reasons of My Smiles"; Queen of Tears OST	Won	
Seoul Music Awards	2024	Main Award (Bonsang)	BSS	Nominated	
Seoul Music Awards	2024	Popularity Award	BSS	Nominated	
Seoul Music Awards	2024	Hallyu Special Award	BSS	Nominated	
Seoul Music Awards	2025	Main Prize (Bonsang)	BSS	Nominated	
Seoul Music Awards	2025	Popularity Award	BSS	Nominated	
Seoul Music Awards	2025	K-Wave Special Award	BSS	Nominated	
Seoul Music Awards	2025	K-pop World Choice – Group	BSS	Nominated	
