= CBZ (Prime Time) =

2025 single by BSS

Single by BSS

from the album Teleparty
- Language: Korean
- Released: January 8, 2025
- Length: 2:33
- Label: Pledis; YG Plus
- Composers: Woozi; Bumzu
- Lyricists: Woozi; Bumzu; Hoshi; DK; Seungkwan

BSS singles chronology
"Fighting" (2023)	"CBZ (Prime Time)" (2025)

Music video
- "CBZ (Prime Time)" on YouTube

"CBZ (Prime Time)" (Korean: 청바지; RR: cheongbaji; lit. 'jeans') is a song recorded by BSS. It was released on January 8, 2025, as the lead single of their second single album, Teleparty, which marked the group's first release in two years after their commercially successful single "Fighting". "CBZ (Prime Time)" was written by the three members of BSS alongside Seventeen member and producer Woozi and frequent Seventeen collaborator Bumzu.

== Background and release ==
In November 2024, it was revealed that BSS were preparing new music. A single album titled Teleparty was announced on December 27, with the tracklist revealed on January 6, including the name of the lead single, "CBZ (Prime Time)". A teaser for the lead single's music video was released the following day, featuring the members handing out denim jeans to students in a classroom, with a cameo appearance from singer and actress Uhm Jung-hwa. "CBZ (Prime Time)" and its accompanying music video were released on January 8.

== Composition ==
"CBZ (Prime Time)" was written by Woozi, Bumzu, Hoshi, DK and Seungkwan. It was composed by Woozi and Bumzu, with Bumzu and BuildingOwner credited for arrangement. The song is described as having swing jazz and country-based sounds. In terms of musical notation, it was composed in the key of D Major, with a tempo of 110 beats per minute.

The song's title in Korean, "청바지" (cheongbaji), refers to a common drinking cheer in South Korea. It is an acronym for "청춘은 바로 지금" (cheongchun-eun balo jigeum), which translates to "youth is right now". The term "청바지" also means "jeans", with the lyrics of the song interpreting both meanings. Throughout the song, the lyrics explore the concept of youth being a mindset rather than age, encouraging the listener to put on jeans and enjoy the moment.

== Critical reception and accolades ==
In her review of the album Teleparty, NME's Carmen Chin commended "CBZ (Prime Time)" for its musical experimentation, highlighting its "refreshing callbacks to the more understated retro eras of pop music", which is best embodied by the song's incorporation of swing jazz and country.

"CBZ (Prime Time)" won one first-place music program award from Music Bank on January 17, 2025.

== Music video ==
The music video was released alongside the single on 8 January 2025. Intended as a celebration of youth, it depicts individuals from various walks of life, including exhausted students and office workers, a distressed mother, and a teenage daughter, joining BSS in a joyful chant of "CBZ" to convey the message of the youth being anyone who finds joy in the moment. The video features cameos of South Korean celebrities Uhm Jung-hwa, Kal So-won, Jung Young-ju, and Moon Sang-hoon.

== Charts ==
=== Weekly charts ===
Weekly chart performance for "CBZ (Prime Time)"
Chart (2025)	Peak position
Global Excl. US (Billboard)	171
Japan (Japan Hot 100)	5
Japan Digital Singles (Oricon)	36
New Zealand Hot Singles (RMNZ)	40
Singapore Regional (RIAS)	20
South Korea (Circle)	22
Taiwan (Billboard)	20
US World Digital Song Sales (Billboard)	10

=== Monthly charts ===
Monthly chart performance for "CBZ (Prime Time)"
Chart (2025)	Position
South Korea (Circle)	51

=== Year-end charts ===
Year-end chart performance for "CBZ (Prime Time)"
Chart (2025)	Position
South Korea (Circle)	193

== Release history ==
Release history for "CBZ (Prime Time)"
Region	Date	Format	Label	Ref.
Various	January 8, 2025	Digital download; streaming	Pledis; YG Plus	
