= Hoshi (South Korean singer) =

South Korean singer (born 1996)

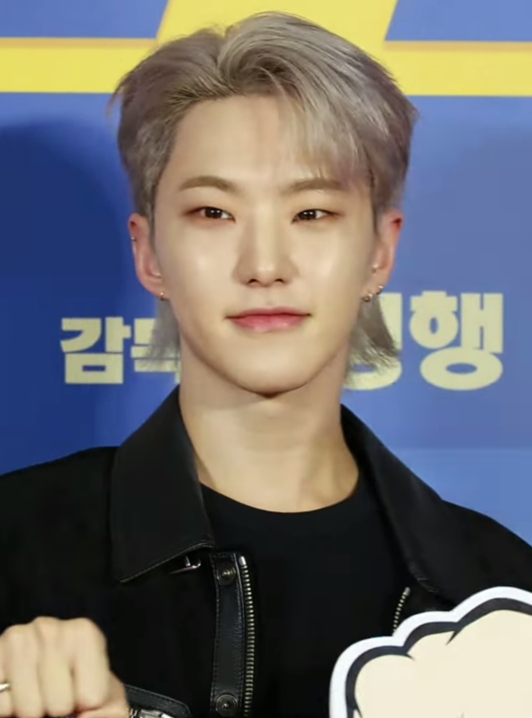
- Hoshi in 2024
- Born: Kwon Soon-young; June 15, 1996 (age 30); Namyangju, South Korea
- Occupations: Singer; songwriter; dancer
- Musical career
- Genre: K-pop
- Instrument: Vocals
- Years active: 2015–present
- Label: Pledis
- Member of: Seventeen; BSS; HxW

Korean name
- Hangul: 권순영
- RR: Gwon Sunyeong
- MR: Kwŏn Sunyŏng

Stage name
- Hangul: 호시
- RR: Hosi
- MR: Hosi

Kwon Soon-young (Korean: 권순영; born June 15, 1996), known by his stage name Hoshi (호시), is a South Korean singer and dancer. Managed by Pledis Entertainment, he is a member of the South Korean boy band Seventeen, the leader of its performance team and part of its subunits BSS and Hoshi X Woozi. Hoshi made his solo debut with "Spider" on April 2, 2021.

== Early life ==
Kwon Soon-young was born on June 15, Gyeonggi Province, South Korea. He grew up in Namyangju, where he attended Maseok Middle School and Maseok High School.

As a child, Kwon trained in taekwondo and competed in sparring. He also held a fourth-degree black belt. After entering middle school, he established a dance club and won first place at a citywide dance competition. He was later scouted by Pledis Entertainment at a provincial dance competition.

== Career ==
=== 2011–2014: Pre-debut ===
Hoshi joined Pledis Entertainment in 2011, while in his third year of middle school, after being approached by a company representative at a provincial dance competition.

In 2013, he appeared on Seventeen TV, an online reality show that introduced Pledis' trainees and showed potential members of the boy group Seventeen before their official debut. The show was broadcast periodically on Ustream, where the trainees showed themselves training, singing, creating choreographies, and playing games. The online show, titled Like Seventeen, also included participation in concerts.

=== 2015–present: Seventeen and solo and sub-unit activities ===
In 2015, Hoshi debuted as a member of the South Korean boy group Seventeen with the extended play 17 Carat on May 29. Alongside members Seungkwan and DK, Hoshi formed a subunit of Seventeen, BSS or BooSeokSoon, a common nickname for the three members. The group released their debut single "Just Do It" on March 21, 2018.

On April 2, 2021, Hoshi released his first solo song, "Spider". Hoshi participated in the overall production process of the song, including lyrics and performance. In 2023, Hoshi and his bandmate Joshua were cast in TVING's reality show Bro and Marble in Dubai alongside Yoo Yeon-seok, Lee Dong-hwi, Kyuhyun, Jee Seok-jin, Jo Se-ho and Lee Seung-gi.

On February 19, 2025, Pledis Entertainment announced that Hoshi would be debuting in a sub-unit with Woozi as Hoshi X Woozi with the release of a single album titled Beam on March 10. On his 29th birthday later that year, he released "I Want You Back". He later released two more digital singles "Take a Shot" and "Fallen Superstar" on September 16, the enlistment day of his mandatory military service, and November 11, respectively. In March 2026, Hoshi released the track "Baby, Honey".

== Other ventures ==
=== Endorsements ===
Hoshi has been appointed by various brands to endorse their products. In July 2023, Hoshi was selected to be the Japan ambassador for South Korean vegan skincare brand d'Alba before being promoted to be its Asia Global ambassador in May the following year. In October 2023, he was announced to be the first brand ambassador for the South Korean household kimchi brand Jongga. To promote the brand, Jongga sponsored a kimchi-inspired Vogue Korea fashion pictorial which depicted Hoshi in various themes of red. Similarly, Hoshi was later featured on the July 2024 digital cover of the South Korean magazine High Cut, which presented the theme of "Hoshi's secret space filled with joy", alluding to his real-life fondness of kimchi.

In August 2024, Hoshi and Seventeen member S.Coups became the brand ambassadors of NARS Korea, beginning the ambassadorship with a cover pictorial on Allure Korea's September issue. In January 2025, they were selected as the models for the brand's limited edition NARS Amor Collection. In March 2025, Hoshi partnered with Nongshim Kellogg's to release the limited edition Kellogg's Hoshi Collaboration Pack. Physically available in five versions, the collaboration comprises an assortment of snacks selected by Hoshi and features the original character Soontoni, whose name combines Hoshi's real name, Kwon Soonyoung, with Tony the Tiger, the brand's Corn Frost mascot.

=== Fashion ===
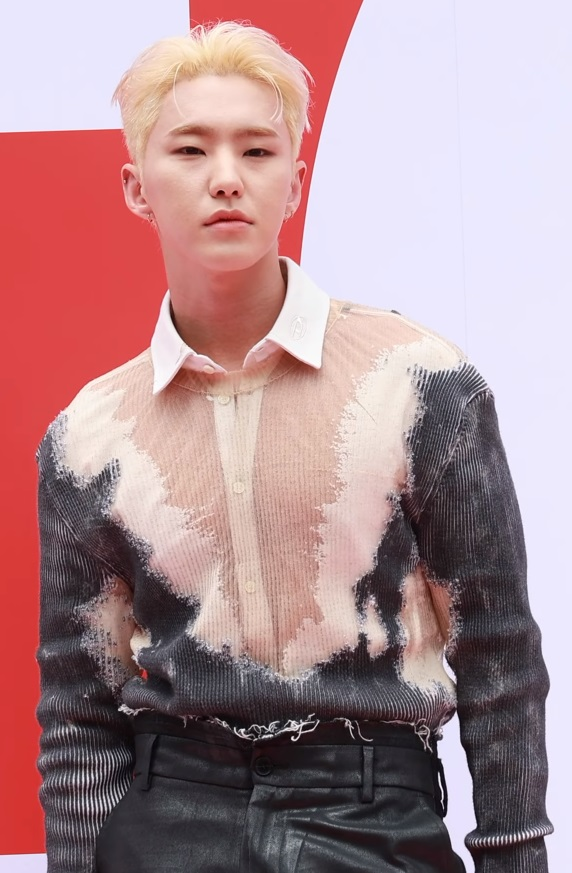
Hoshi at a Diesel store opening in Seoul in 2024

On January 19, 2023, Hoshi made his first appearance at Paris Fashion Week when he attended the Alexandre Mattiussi Menswear Fall/Winter 2023–2024 show by French luxury fashion house AMI Paris. After attending the Fall 2024 show by luxury denim brand Diesel in Milan, Hoshi was announced as its APAC brand ambassador in July 2024.

=== Philanthropy ===
In March 2020, Hoshi donated ₩50 million (US$42,694) to the Hope Bridge National Disaster Relief Association to support people affected by the COVID-19 pandemic and medical personnel. In October 2020, he donated ₩23.1 million in scholarships to students at Maseok High School.

On June 10, 2021, Hoshi donated ₩100 million to the Namyangju Welfare Foundation and joined the Gyeonggi Community Chest of Korea's Honor Society for major donors. In December, Namyangju City awarded him a plaque of appreciation for his charitable contributions.

== Personal life ==
=== Military service ===
On July 8, 2025, Pledis Entertainment announced that Hoshi would enlist as an active-duty soldier in the Republic of Korea Army on September 16. He enlisted as scheduled on September 16. During his service, he was selected as a Special Warrior and later joined the Army Taekwondo Demonstration Team. He is scheduled to be discharged on March 15, 2027.

On September 12, 2026, Hoshi announced that he had sustained a complete anterior cruciate ligament tear while rehearsing with the Ground Forces performance team. He said that he would undergo surgery and focus on his recovery, and would not participate in scheduled Army Taekwondo Demonstration Team events or the Ground Forces Festival.

== Discography ==
=== Singles ===
Title	Year	Peak chart positions		Album
Title	Year	KOR	US World	Album
"Spider"	2021	–	5	Non-album single
"Screen Time" (Epik High featuring Hoshi)	2023	129	–	Screen Time
"Take A Shot"	2025	—	—	Non-album singles
"Fallen Superstar"	2025	—	—	Non-album singles
"—" denotes releases that did not chart or were not released in that region.

=== Other charted songs ===
Title	Year	Peak chart positions	Album
Title	Year	KOR	Album
"Damage" (Note: Credited under Seventeen but is a solo track performed by Hoshi.-ua) (Featuring Timbaland)	2025	47	Happy Burstday

=== Soundtrack appearances ===
Title	Year	Album
"Shingiru" (with Joshua)	2023	Bro&Marble in Dubai OST
"Our Vacation" (with the cast of Bro&Marble in Dubai (Note: Lee Seung-gi, Yoo Yeon-seok, Kyuhyun, Jee Seok-jin, Lee Dong-hwi, Jo Se-ho, and Joshua))	2023	Bro&Marble in Dubai OST
"Goddess of Despair"	2024	Astra: Knights of Veda OST

=== Composition credits ===
All credits are adapted from the Korea Music Copyright Association unless stated otherwise.

Year	Artist	Song	Album	Lyrics		Music		Ref.
Year	Artist	Song	Album	Credited	With	Credited	With	Ref.
2015	Seventeen	"Jam Jam"	17 Carat	Yes	Woozi, Dino, Vernon	No	—N/a	
2015	Seventeen	"Still Lonely"	Love & Letter	Yes	Woozi, Vernon, Wonwoo, Seungkwan	No	—N/a	
2016	Seventeen	"No F.U.N"	Love & Letter - Repackage Album	Yes	Woozi, S.Coups, Vernon, Wonwoo, Seungkwan, Dino	No	—N/a	
2016	Seventeen	"Highlight"	Going Seventeen	Yes	Bumzu, Dino, Jun, The8, Lee Yoo-jung	Yes	Bumzu	
2016	Seventeen	"Fast Pace"	Going Seventeen	Yes	Woozi, S.Coups, Vernon	No	—N/a	
2017	Seventeen	"Don't Wanna Cry"	Al1	Yes	Woozi, Vernon, Jeonghan, Bumzu	No	—N/a	
2017	Seventeen	"Swimming Fool"	Al1	No	—N/a	Yes	Woozi, Bumzu	
2017	Seventeen	"Who"	Al1	Yes	Dino	No	—N/a	
2017	Seventeen	"Change Up"	Teen, Age	Yes	Woozi, S.Coups, Bumzu	No	—N/a	
2017	Seventeen	"Without You"	Teen, Age	Yes	Vernon, S.Coups, Jeonghan, The8, Mingyu, DK, Dino, Bumzu	No	—N/a	
2017	Seventeen	"Clap"	Teen, Age	Yes	Vernon, Jeonghan, Mingyu, DK, Seungkwan, Bumzu	No	—N/a	
2017	Seventeen	Bring It	Teen, Age	Yes	Woozi, Vernon	No	—N/a	
2018	Seventeen	"Thanks"	Director's Cut	Yes	Woozi, Bumzu	No	—N/a	
2018	Seventeen	"Moonwalker"	You Make My Day	Yes	Woozi, Bumzu, Dino	No	—N/a	
2018	Seventeen	"Shhh"	You Made My Dawn	Yes	Bumzu, Dino	No	—N/a	
2018	Seventeen	"Getting Closer"	You Made My Dawn	No	—N/a	Yes	Woozi, Bumzu	
2019	Seventeen	"247"	An Ode	Yes	Woozi, Bumzu, The8, Dino	No	—N/a	
2020	Seventeen	"Together"	Heng:garæ	Yes	Woozi, Bumzu, S.Coups, Mingyu	No	—N/a	
2020	Seventeen	Light a Flame	Semicolon	Yes	Woozi, Bumzu, Wonwoo	No	—N/a	
2021	Hoshi	"Spider"	Non-album single	Yes	Woozi, Bumzu	No	Woozi, Park Gi-tae (Prismfilter)	
2021	Seventeen	"Wave"	Your Choice	Yes	Woozi, Bumzu, Jun, The8, Dino	No	—N/a	
2021	Hoshi	"Tiger Power"	Non-album single	Yes	Woozi, Bumzu, Glenn (Prismfilter)	Yes	Bumzu	
2021	Seventeen	"Pang"	Attacca	Yes	Woozi, Bumzu, Dino	No	—N/a	
2022	Seventeen	"If You Leave Me"	Face the Sun	Yes	Woozi, Bumzu, S.Coups, Nmore (Prismfilter)	No	—N/a	
2022	Seventeen	"Cheers"	Sector 17	Yes	Woozi, Bumzu, S.Coups	No	—N/a	
2022	Hoshi (feat. Tiger JK)	"Tiger"	Non-album single	Yes	Woozi, Tiger JK	No	—N/a	
2023	BSS	"Fighting" (파이팅 해야지) feat. Lee Young-ji	Second Wind	Yes	Woozi, Bumzu, DK, Seungkwan, Lee Young-ji	Yes	Woozi, Tiger JK	
2023	BSS	"Lunch"	Second Wind	Yes	Woozi, Bumzu, DK, Seungkwan	No	—N/a	
2023	BSS	"7PM" (7시예 들어줘) feat. Peder Elias	Second Wind	No	—N/a	Yes	Woozi, Bumzu, Peder Elias, DK, Seungkwan	
2023	Seventeen	"I Don't Understand But I Luv U"	FML	Yes	Woozi, Bumzu, Dino	No	—N/a	
2023	Hoshi	"Stay"	—N/a	Yes	Glenn	Yes	Glenn, Nmore (Prismfilter)	
2023	Seventeen	"Back 2 Back"	Seventeenth Heaven	Yes	Woozi, Bumzu	No	—N/a	
2024	Seventeen	"Rain"	Spill the Feels	Yes	Woozi, Bumzu, Dino	No	—N/a	
2025	BSS	"CBZ (Prime Time)" (청바지)	Teleparty	Yes	Woozi, Bumzu, DK, Seungkwan	No	—N/a	
2025	BSS	"Happy Alone"	Teleparty	Yes	Woozi, Bumzu, DK, Seungkwan	No	—N/a	
2025	BSS	"Love Song" (사랑 노래)	Teleparty	Yes	Woozi, Bumzu, DK, Seungkwan	No	—N/a	
2025	Hoshi X Woozi	"Pinocchio" feat. So!YoON!	Beam	Yes	Woozi, Bumzu, DK, Jintae Ko, David Brook, Jimmy Burney	No	—N/a	
2025	Hoshi X Woozi	"96ers" (동갑내기)	Beam	Yes	Woozi, Bumzu	Yes	Woozi, Bumzu, Cesar Peralta, Ollipop, Ryan Lawrie, Benji Bae, Andreas Öberg, Christoffer Jonsson, Jake K	
2025	Hoshi X Woozi	"Stupid Idiot"	Beam	Yes	Woozi, Bumzu, Pink Slip	Yes	Woozi, Bumzu, Pink Slip	

== Filmography ==
=== Television shows ===
Year	Title	Role	Notes	Ref.
2018	Creaking Heroes	Cast member		
2018	King of Mask Singer	Contestant	Ep. 153-154	
2018	Dancing High	Special judge	Ep. 7-8	

=== Web shows ===
Year	Title	Role	Ref.
2013–2014	Seventeen TV	Cast member	
2015	Hoshi and Seungkwan's Andromeda	Cast member	
2023	Bromarble	Cast member	

=== Music video appearances ===
Year	Title	Artist	Notes	Ref.
2012	"Face"	NU'EST	Pre-debut	
2012	"Venus"	Hello Venus	Pre-debut	
2014	"My Copycat"	Orange Caramel	Pre-debut	
