= DK X Seungkwan =

South Korean musical duo

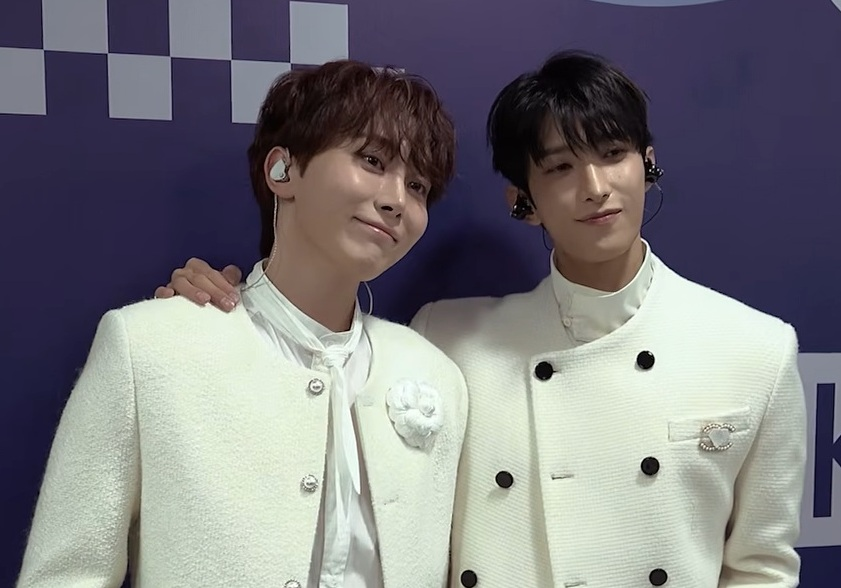
- Seungkwan and DK in 2026

Background information
- Also known as: DxS
- Origin: Seoul, South Korea
- Genre: K-pop
- Years active: 2026–present
- Label: Pledis
- Spinoff of: Seventeen; BSS
- Members: DK; Seungkwan

DK X Seungkwan (Korean: 도겸X승관; also known as DxS) is a sub-unit of South Korean boy band Seventeen, consisting of vocal team members DK and Seungkwan. Formed by Pledis Entertainment in 2026, the duo debuted on January 12 with the extended play (EP) Serenade.

== History ==
On November 6, 2025, Pledis Entertainment announced that DK and Seungkwan of Seventeen would debut as a new sub-unit, making it the fifth sub-unit of the band. The duo is also a part of the band's another sub-unit BSS. In December, the pair released a cover of Bruno Mars and Lady Gaga's "Die with a Smile", and on December 17, the trailer for their debut extended play (EP) was released, revealing its title and release date, and on December 23, official photos for their album was released.

The duo released their first extended play, Serenade, on January 12, 2026. In support of the EP, the pair performed a showcase on January 18 at the CG Art Hall in Seoul. Its lead single, "Blue", received a nomination for Best Vocal Performance – Group at the 2026 MAMA Awards.

== Discography ==
=== Extended plays ===
List of extended plays, showing selected details, selected chart positions, sales figures, and certifications
Title	Details	Peak chart positions					Sales	Certifications
Title	Details	KOR	JPN	JPN Hot	US	US World	Sales	Certifications
Serenade	Released: January 12, 2026; Label: Pledis; Formats: CD, digital download, streaming	3	3	24	195	3	KOR: 698,842; JPN: 99,404	KMCA: 2× Platinum; RIAJ: Gold (phy.)

=== Singles ===
List of singles, showing year released, selected chart positions, and name of the album
Title	Year	Peak chart position		Album
Title	Year	KOR	KOR Hot	Album
"Blue"	2026	89	46	Serenade

=== Other charted songs ===
List of songs, showing year released, selected chart positions, and name of the album
Title	Year	Peak chart position		Album
Title	Year	KOR	KOR Hot	Album
"Rockstar" (DK solo)	2026	138	—	Serenade
"Dream Serenade" (Seungkwan solo)	2026	— (Note: "Dream Serenade" did not enter the Circle Digital Chart, but peaked at number 5 on the component Download Chart.)	—	Serenade
"Prelude of Love"	2026	— (Note: "Prelude of Love" did not enter the Circle Digital Chart, but peaked at number 8 on the component Download Chart.)	90	Serenade
"Guilty Pleasure"	2026	— (Note: "Guilty Pleasure" did not enter the Circle Digital Chart, but peaked at number 9 on the component Download Chart.)	96	Serenade
"Silence"	2026	— (Note: "Silence" did not enter the Circle Digital Chart, but peaked at number 10 on the component Download Chart.)	83	Serenade
"—" denotes releases that did not chart or were not released in that region.

== Videography ==
=== Music videos ===
Title	Year	Director(s)	Ref.
"Blue" (Cinema ver.)	2026	Annie Chung	
"Blue" (Epilogue ver.)	2026	Iwa	

== Live performances ==
=== Serenade On Stage ===
List of concerts, showing event names, dates, cities, countries, venues and attendance
Date (2026)	City	Country	Venue	Ref.
April 17	Incheon	South Korea	Inspire Arena	
April 18	Incheon	South Korea	Inspire Arena	
April 19	Incheon	South Korea	Inspire Arena	
April 29	Chiba	Japan	Makuhari Messe	
April 30	Chiba	Japan	Makuhari Messe	
May 30	Daegu	South Korea	EXCO East Wing Hall	
May 31	Daegu	South Korea	EXCO East Wing Hall	
June 6	Macao	China	The Venetian Arena	
July 25	Kaohsiung	Taiwan	Kaohsiung Arena	
