= Who I Am (Alan Walker song) =

Single by Alan Walker, Peder Elias and Putri Ariani

from the album Walkerworld 2.0
- Released: 4 January 2024
- Recorded: 2023
- Genre: EDM
- Length: 3:32
- Label: MER Musikk
- Producers: Alan Walker, Kasper

Alan Walker singles chronology
"Fire!" (2023)	"Who I Am" (2024)	"Team Side" (2024)

Music video
- "Who I Am" on YouTube

"Who I Am" is song by Norwegian music producer and DJ Alan Walker, Norwegian singer Peder Elias and Indonesian singer Putri Ariani, released as a single on 4 January 2024 through MER.

== Background ==
Putri Ariani is an Indonesian singer-songwriter, who won Indonesia's Got Talent and finished 4th place on America's Got Talent. She also performed the song "Not You" live with Alan Walker (which was popular in Indonesia). Inspired by her story, Walker decided she would be ideal for the song he was working on, about his own journey as an artist.

The song was released, with Peder Elias and Putri Ariani also joining a Discord podcast. The main drop samples a song from the 1955 Norwegian film Karius og Baktus, written by Christian Hartmann (which also has songwriting credits). It uses a similar style to On My Way, also featuring orchestral elements.

Walker has this to say about the song: "When I first started releasing music, I kept it mostly to myself. I found sharing my songs with others intimidating and I feared not "fitting in the crowd" with my style of music. Mom and Dad always taught me to be true to myself and follow my heart. Even if that meant going against the current sometimes.. Together with some amazing people, I decided to write a song about this." He continued, “'Who I Am' is a song about being true to yourself and following your heart. A little over 10 years ago, my heart was with music. And I'm so glad I found the courage to pursue it. Hope you do the same."

=== The breakup of the collaboration with Loreen ===
In 2024, Walker and the MER team were working on the song. The song featured Loreen, who sang the Eurovision Song Contest (ESC) winning song "Tattoo", as well as Peder Elias and Putri Ariani. Loreen was the front-runner to win at last year's Melodifestivalen and a new collaboration was expected to be announced after her win at the ESC. However, after the win, Walker's manager Gunnar Greve was informed that Loreen would not be participating in the song. Discussions were held about Loreen's schedule and duet partners, but it was ultimately decided that she was not right for the song. Greve said that while he has a positive outlook for future endeavors, the process was very frustrating given the history. Loreen's manager Tony Beard also expressed hope that Loreen would have the opportunity to collaborate with Walker again. Universal Music's Niklas Torsell also said, "Loreen loves Alan and would love to collaborate again in the future." Walker's manager, Greve, took a non-professional stance on the matter, saying he was disappointed that Loreen was not involved but believed the value her talent and personality brought to the song was immeasurable. Greve said it was "personally disappointing because a lot of time and effort was put into it," but acknowledged that while it's unlikely the song will be sung by another artist, past experiences are part of creating new opportunities.

== Critical reception ==
OldTimeMusic.com said that Who I Am is about "Breaking free from social expectations," and Kumparan said that Who I Am had "motivating lyrics."

== Music video ==
The music video was released on January 20, two weeks after the song's release. Set in Walkerworld, the AVI-8 drone will show moments in Walker's life from his childhood to his current career. Video submissions from fans will also be solicited, some of which can be viewed. The music video has been viewed more than 20 million times as of March 2024.

== Restrung version ==
On 29 February 2024, Walker published an restrung version of the song called "Who I Am (Restrung Performance Version)". The song retains the build-up elements of the original, but Walker removes them to create a galloping folk-like rhythm enhanced by the string section and vocal choir.

The Restrung version of the video, uploaded by Walker's YouTube account on February 24, has been viewed over 9 million times as of March 2024, with over 500,000 likes and more than 40,000 comments. In this music video, Alan Walker, Putri Ariani, and Peder Elias sing against the backdrop of Norway's Andalsnes Mountains, accompanied by other musicians. Walker says in a statement about the video: "It almost feels surreal that just 10 days ago, we were standing on the mountain tops in Norway to shoot this video. I was prepared for the Norwegian winter, but the gusts of wind on the first day of filming were intense! Poor Putri came from 35 degrees in Indonesia. Fortunately, it calmed down, and we ended up with an incredibly beautiful product, and not least and amazing experience."

== Track listing ==
Digital - Single
No.	Title	Length
1.	"Who I Am"	3:13

Digital - EP
No.	Title	Length
1.	"Who I Am"	3:13
2.	"Who I Am (Restrung Performance Version)"	3:30
3.	"Who I Am (Gravero Version)"	3:10
4.	"Who I Am (Feel Koplo Dangdut Version)"	3:49
5.	"Who I Am (AW Vip Mix)"	2:07
6.	"Who I Am (AW Relift)"	2:16
7.	"Who I Am (Instrumental)"	3:13
8.	"Who I Am (Acapella)"	2:52

== Charts ==
Chart (2024)	Peak position
Norway (VG-lista)	18
US Hot Dance/Electronic Songs (Billboard)	41
