= Teleparty =

- Digital cover

Single album by BSS
- Released: January 8, 2025
- Genre: K-pop
- Length: 9:15
- Languages: Korean; English
- Labels: Pledis; YG Plus

BSS chronology
Second Wind (2023)	Teleparty (2025)

Singles from Teleparty
- 1. "CBZ (Prime Time)" Released: January 8, 2025

Teleparty is the second single album by BSS, a sub-unit of the South Korean boy band Seventeen. It was released by Pledis Entertainment on January 8, 2025, alongside its lead single "CBZ (Prime Time)".

== Background and release ==
In November 2024, it was revealed that BSS were preparing new music. Teleparty was then announced on December 27, the trio's first release since their commercially successful debut single album Second Wind (2023). A portmanteau of the words "telepathy" and "party", Teleparty was chosen as the album title to remind fans to "pause and savor the ordinary yet precious moments of everyday life". The announcement for the album featured the members in an "election campaign-style video", rallying a crowd on the significance of enjoying their youth.

On December 29, Pledis Entertainment announced that promotions for the single album would be paused in respect for the victims of Jeju Air Flight 2216. Promotions resumed on January 5, 2025, following a national week of mourning in South Korea.

The full tracklist was revealed on January 6; the songs were written by all three members of BSS, alongside Seventeen bandmate Woozi and regular collaborator Bumzu. A teaser for the lead single's music video was released the following day, featuring the members handing out denim jeans to students in a classroom, with a cameo appearance from singer and actress Uhm Jung-hwa. The album and lead single "CBZ (Prime Time)", alongside the latter's accompanying music video, were released on January 8.

Many of the promotional releases include references to a fictional election, with outlets drawing comparisons to the 2024 South Korean political situation, though both BSS and Pledis Entertainment have emphasized that the concept is fictional and was prepared in the first half of 2024.

== Music ==
The single album includes three songs. The lead single, "CBZ (Prime Time)", is described as having swing jazz and country-based sounds. "Happy Alone" resembles new jack swing, while "Love Song" is reminiscent of 2000s R&B.

== Promotion ==
BSS hosted a fan party on January 12 to commemorate the album at the CG Art Hall in Seoul. The event included the members "spreading happiness to all generations", with behind-the-scenes content and special performances. The event had a dress code of jeans, with the members hosting quizzes, performing covers and BSS songs, and was well received; regarded as having similar energy to a Seventeen concert.

== Critical reception ==
In a review for NME, Carmen Chin awarded Teleparty five out of five stars, commending the record for its experimentation, stylistic tone, and narrative-driven music; she further recognized it as "the perfect sister album" to Second Wind.

== Commercial performance ==
In South Korea, Teleparty sold a total of 529,936 copies during its first week of release, topping both the Circle Album Chart and Hanteo Chart, an album sales aggregation website.

== Track listing ==
All lyrics are written by Woozi, Bumzu, Hoshi, DK, and Seungkwan.

Teleparty track listing
No.	Title	Music	Arrangement	Length
1.	"CBZ (Prime Time)" (청바지)	Woozi; Bumzu	Bumzu; BuildingOwner	2:33
2.	"Happy Alone"	Woozi; Bumzu; Tobias Näslund		3:47
3.	"Love Song" (사랑 노래)	Woozi; Bumzu	Bumzu; BuildingOwner	2:55
Total length:				9:15

== Charts ==
=== Weekly charts ===
Weekly chart performance for Teleparty
Chart (2025)	Peak position
Japan (Oricon)	2
Japan Combined Singles (Oricon)	2
Japan Top Singles Sales (Billboard Japan)	2
South Korean Albums (Circle)	1
South Korean Albums (Circle) Weverse Album	2
South Korean Albums (Circle) Kit Album	4

=== Monthly charts ===
Monthly chart performance for Teleparty
Chart (2025)	Position
Japan (Oricon)	5
South Korean Albums (Circle)	1
South Korean Albums (Circle) Weverse Album	7
South Korean Albums (Circle) Kit Album	9

=== Year-end charts ===
Year-end chart performance for Teleparty
Chart (2025)	Position
Japan Top Singles Sales (Billboard Japan)	99
Japan (Oricon)	81
South Korean Albums (Circle)	45

== Certifications ==
Certifications for Teleparty
Region	Certification	Certified units/sales
South Korea (KMCA)	Platinum	250,000^{^}
^{^} Shipments figures based on certification alone.
