= Second Wind (single album) =

- Digital cover

Single album by BSS
- Released: February 6, 2023
- Genre: K-pop
- Length: 9:59
- Language: Korean; English
- Label: Pledis; YG Plus

BSS chronology
Second Wind (2023)	Teleparty (2025)

Singles from Second Wind
- 1. "Fighting" Released: February 6, 2023

Second Wind is the debut single album by BSS, a sub-unit of the South Korean boy band Seventeen. It was released on February 6, 2023, alongside its lead single "Fighting", featuring Lee Young-ji. Serving as BSS's first release in almost five years, Second Wind topped the Circle Album Chart and broke the first-week sales record for an album released by a K-pop sub-unit.

== Background and release ==
On January 7, 2023, BSS announced their plans of releasing a new single album, marking the sub-unit's first return since their debut digital single "Just Do It" nearly five years prior. Although the track was intended to be a one-time skit created for Caratland, a fan meeting event for Seventeen, positive feedback and demand from fans prompted BSS to plan for another project. On January 12, Pledis Entertainment further revealed details of the album's name, Second Wind; album versions; and February 6 release date. Conceived as an album with an active sports aesthetic, a special version of Second Wind was launched, featuring BSS-themed sports apparel (a t-shirt, scrunchie, hairband, mask, and socks) arranged inside a shoebox-inspired package.

On February 2, BSS teased the single album's three-song tracklist through a highlight medley designed to mimic a fitness app's goal tracker progression. "Going BSS", a two-episode special of Seventeen's web variety show Going Seventeen, as well as two official teasers, were also aired to support the album's release.

Second Wind was digitally and physically released worldwide on February 6, 2023. Its lead single, "Fighting", was released with an accompanying music video on the same day. On February 23, BSS shared a special performance video of the track "7PM", featuring Norwegian singer Peder Elias.

== Critical reception ==
Professional ratings for Second Wind
Review scores
Source	Rating
NME	4/5 stars

Lee Ha-na of Newsen commended the album for "breathing a new wind into the music industry" with its charming ability to transform into a "support group that is always by your side". In a review for NME, Tanu Raj scored Second Wind four out of five stars, noting the album as the "perfect pick-me-up" and "a record that exudes endless, sunny optimism".

== Commercial performance ==
On the first day of its release, Second Wind was reported to have sold over 478,000 copies, immediately breaking the first-week sales record for an album released by a sub-unit of a K-pop band. By the end of the first week, it sold a record 610,189 copies in total. The album also debuted at number one on the Circle Album Chart on the week-ending date of February 11, 2023.

The album's lead single "Fighting" entered the Circle Digital Chart at number five and topped its component Download Chart in the issue dated February 5–11, 2023. The song debuted at number one on the Billboard Japan Hot 100 chart dated February 15, 2023. It also debuted at number eight on the World Digital Song Sales chart issued on February 18, 2023.

== Track listing ==
Second Wind track listing
No.	Title	Lyrics	Music	Length
1.	"Fighting" (파이팅 해야지; featuring Lee Young-ji)	Woozi; Bumzu; Hoshi; DK; Seungkwan; Lee Young-ji	Woozi; Bumzu; Hoshi; S.Coups; Park Ki-Tae (Prismfilter)	3:24
2.	"Lunch"	Woozi; Bumzu; Hoshi; DK; Seungkwan	Kyler Niko; Willie Weeks	3:20
3.	"7PM" (7시예 들어줘; featuring Peder Elias)	Woozi; Bumzu; Peder Elias	Woozi; Bumzu; Peder Elias; Hoshi; DK; Seungkwan	3:15
Total length:				9:59

== Charts ==
=== Weekly charts ===
Weekly chart performance for Second Wind
Chart (2023)	Peak position
Belgian Albums (Ultratop Flanders)	180
Belgian Albums (Ultratop Wallonia)	76
German Albums (Offizielle Top 100)	76
Japan (Oricon)	3
Japan Combined Singles (Oricon)	3
Japan Top Singles Sales (Billboard Japan)	3
Portuguese Albums (AFP)	7
South Korean Albums (Circle)	1
South Korean Albums (Circle) Weverse Album	3
Swiss Albums (Schweizer Hitparade)	88

=== Monthly charts ===
Monthly chart performance for Second Wind
Chart (2023)	Peak position
Japan (Oricon)	8
South Korean Albums (Circle)	1
South Korean Albums (Circle) Weverse Album	8

=== Year-end charts ===
Year-end chart performance for Second Wind
Chart (2023)	Position
Japan (Oricon)	93
Japan Top Singles Sales (Billboard Japan)	93
South Korean Albums (Circle)	44
South Korean Albums (Circle) Weverse Album	97

== Certifications ==
Certifications for Second Wind
Region	Certification	Certified units/sales
South Korea (KMCA)	2× Platinum	500,000^{^}
^{^} Shipments figures based on certification alone.
