= Prison Life of Fools =

South Korean television program

- Promotional poster
- Also known as: Mafia Game in Prison
- Hangul: 호구들의 감빵생활
- Hanja: 虎口들의 감빵生活
- RR: Hogudeurui gamppangsaenghwal
- MR: Hogudŭrŭi kamppangsaenghwal
- Genre: Game show Variety show
- Presented by: Kim Tae-jin
- Starring: Lee Soo-geun; Jung Hyung-don; Kim Jong-min; Hwang Je-sung; Lee Sang-yeob; Jang Do-yeon; JB (GOT7); Seungkwan (Seventeen); Choi Ye-na (IZ*ONE); Han Bo-reum
- Country of origin: South Korea
- Original language: Korean
- No. of seasons: 1
- No. of episodes: 26

Production
- Production location: South Korea
- Running time: 90 minutes
- Production companies: tvN, CJ ENM

Original release
- Network: tvN
- Release: March 16 – September 7, 2019

Prison Life of Fools (Korean: 호구들의 감빵생활) was a South Korean television program that aired on tvN, as the first part of the Amazing Saturday lineup. It starred Lee Soo-geun, Jung Hyung-don, Kim Jong-min, Hwang Je-sung, Lee Sang-yeob, Jang Do-yeon, JB (Got7), Seungkwan (Seventeen) and Choi Ye-na (IZ*ONE), with Kim Tae-jin as the main host. The program aired every Saturday at 18:05 (KST) from March 16, 2019 until September 7, 2019.

On March 21, 2019 tvN confirmed that Han Bo-reum would join the show as a fixed cast member, starting from episode 5.

== Program ==
The game of Mafia is played in the setting of a prison, for a total of ₩9,000,000 of custody money.

=== Rules ===
- Each round of mafia lasts 2 episodes from Rounds 1-12. As new rules would apply, each round of mafia will last only 1 episode starting from Round 13.
- There are 3 mafias to arrest, and there are only 4 voting rounds to arrest all 3 mafias. As new rules would apply, there are only 3 voting rounds starting from Round 13.
- There are up to 5 reformation activities to play from Rounds 1-12. As new rules would apply, there will be only 3 reformation activities to play starting from Round 13.
- Acknowledgement of Roles:
  - There are a total of 10 players from Rounds 1-7, and that number increased to 12 beginning Round 8. In Round 14 that number increased again to 14.
  - Before the start of each round, the players each choose their own cells. They will check the card that is placed in each of the cells, acknowledging himself/herself as a mafia or a model prisoner without the other players knowing. The cards of the model prisoners contain a common keyword and the mafias do not know this particular keyword. No open revealing of the keyword is allowed through the round of mafia.
  - An additional rule was added starting from Round 4. After choosing their cells, the players will undergo Mind Control Time. This is for the players to not distract one another while looking at the cards, giving those who are model prisoners some time to think about how to express the keyword if they happen to have lost a reformation activity, and giving those who are mafias some time to adjust their conditions. It is then revealed in episode 8 that during this time the mafias are actually discussing their strategies through a secret group chat found in the phones that are found together with their cards. Plus, after the third voting round ends, all players will enter their cells again, and this is when the mafias discuss their strategies again through the phones.
  - The players will be split into 2 teams, namely Honesty Class (정직반) and Diligence Class (성실반) based on the colors of the attires to be worn which are hanged in the cells.
  - From Rounds 1-10, the mafia distribution in both teams is fixed to 2 in one team and 1 in the other team. Starting from Round 11, besides the mafia distribution stated, it is also possible that all 3 mafias are from the same team.
- First Impression Voting: Starting from Round 9, after the Mind Control Time, all players will each tell secretly who he/she thinks is one of the mafias based on first impression, without one another knowing. Multiple names can be said by 1 player. This does not affect any part of the whole game of mafia.
- Reformation Activities:
  - The reformation activities played are team battles except for the third reformation activity, which is an individual battle.
  - Every player in the winning team of each reformation activity obtains an extra vote.
  - For individual reformation activity, the number of extra votes obtained varies.
  - If there is a fifth reformation activity played, the winning team of this reformation activity can bring in one of the players of the opposing team and use the interrogation room, in hopes of finding the mafia through this player.
- Penalty:
  - The losing team of each reformation activity will have to execute a penalty of expressing the keyword.
  - After the 1st, 3rd and 5th reformation activities, the keyword is expressed through drawings.
  - After the 2nd and 4th reformation activities, the keyword is expressed through actions.
  - However, for only after the 3rd reformation activity (which is an individual battle), all players that are not arrested, instead of only the losing team, will have to express the keyword through drawing.
- Voting:
  - Voting of the mafias will start after the penalty. Each player votes for a player he/she thinks is a mafia by attaching a yellow Velcro strap to that player.
  - There is no voting after the third reformation activity.
  - The extra votes that are won through reformation activities are black Velcro straps. These can only be used in the final voting round (or in the special case where after every player has voted, there are at least 2 players who are tied for most voted and there has to be only 1 player to be the most voted in either of the first 3 voting rounds, these extra votes can be used to push 1 of the players to become the most voted, after listening to those players defending themselves from getting those extra votes).
- After Voting:
  - The most voted player will be arrested, regardless of whether he/she is revealed to be a mafia or a model prisoner. The arrested players can continue to participate in the remaining reformation activities, but will have no voting rights for the subsequent voting round(s). However, from Round 5 of mafia, a new rule is added, which states that for the third reformation activity, the arrested players can take part and win extra votes to be used in only the final voting round.
  - When a mafia has been arrested in a voting round, ₩3,000,000 will be divided in the following distribution: ₩2,000,000 will go to the team that won the reformation activity before this particular voting round and ₩1,000,000 will go to the team that lost.
- Mafia Death Note:
  - This new rule began in Round 8.
  - The mafias have to come to an agreement on 1 model prisoner to get arrested without any voting during the mafias' second strategic meeting, and he/she will have his/her current votes possessed taken away.
  - The mafias can also choose not to use the Mafia Death Note at all.
- In the situation where there are 2 mafias left not arrested after 3 voting rounds, in the final voting round the top 2 most voted players will be arrested.
- The round is over when all 3 mafias are arrested. If there is at least 1 mafia still not arrested after all the voting rounds, the entire ₩9,000,000 will go to the mafias.

=== Reformation Activities ===
==== Team ====
- Finger Land's Dance Princesses: Before the start of this reformation activity, each team will arrange the order of answering. The answering players (1 from each team in a round) watch the dance movements to a song by the finger dancing crew SonyToby. The answering players will move with their hyodo chairs to Kim Tae-jin. The first to reach him gets to answer first, and if that player answers the correct song name and its singer, the remaining 4 players of that player's team will have to sing the correct lyrics through the standing mics provided. If a player of one team sings the wrong lyrics to that song, the chance will go to the other team. The first team to sing 3 songs correctly wins the reformation activity. Starting from Round 12 of mafia, the team who answered the song name and its singer correctly first gets a "One More Time" card, which can be used if the singing players of the same team sang the wrong lyrics to get a second try thereafter.
  - An alternate version of this reformation activity named Dance A Song was played from Rounds 6-9, where the choreographs would be demonstrated by 77-year-old Ji Byung-soo, who became famous for his performance of Son Dam-bi's Crazy at National Singing Contest.
  - A second alternate version of this reformation activity named Lyrics Confusion Center was played from Round 12. However, instead of watching the fingers dance, the lyrics to a song will be shown, but are jumbled up. The answering player has to answer the correct song and its singer based on these jumbled lyrics.
- Scream of the Birth, Ageing, Illness and Death: This reformation activity will be played on acupuncture mats. All players will be barefooted (except for Round 9 of mafia, in each team, 1 player can wear socks that protect both his/her entire feet and 1 player can wear socks that protect half of both his/her entire feet).
  - Chicken Fight: For the first game, all players will go up on the field and the last player to survive wins the game for his/her team. For the second game, it will be of a 1-on-1 all-kill basis, and the last player to survive wins the game for his/her team. If it goes to the third game, each team will send 1 player and play, and the winner wins the reformation activity for his/her team.
  - Penalty Shootout: A player from one team chooses a player from the other team. Both players will start moving on the acupuncture mats at different starting points, with one going straight towards the ball and kick it, while the other going from the side to the goal post and attempt to save the kicked ball. If the player kicking the ball scores, that player will secure 1 point for his/her team. The 2 same players will then switch positions and repeat this again for the other team to attempt to score a point if the ball goes in. The team to reach 5 points first wins the reformation activity.
  - Long Jump: Different from the other versions of the reformation activity, this version is an individual battle. Out of the players, the top 6 who jumped the furthest will each get an individual vote, with the first placed player being able to select 1 player to execute the drawing penalty, plus the bottom 5 will have to execute the drawing penalty.
- Chinese Zodiac In My Ears: Each team will select a player from the opposing team and spin the wheel that consists of the animals of the Chinese Zodiac. The player will have to imitate the sound of the animal selected through the wheel spinning and play charades with the remaining players of his/her team. Each team will play 2 rounds and the team with more questions answered wins the reformation activity. Starting from Round 9 of Mafia, instead of just 1 member of each team, every member will have to imitate the sound of the animal selected through the wheel spinning, and switch to the next member of the team after the answer is guessed correctly.
  - An alternate version of this reformation activity named From 1 To 10 It's All About Your Voice was played from Round 12 of mafia. The only difference compared to the original is that the wheel consists of 10 insects and animals, that are not from the Chinese Zodiac.
  - If both teams are tied after all the rounds are played (happens in Round 8 of mafia), the tiebreaker is done by spinning the wheel and whichever team that spun the wheel and landed on the Dragon wins the reformation activity.
- Match Between The Barrier: This is a match played on the ground.
  - Ping Pong: For each game, both teams will each send 2 players and share a big shirt together. Both players of each team have to move together as one. The team to reach 7 points first takes the game. The first team to take 2 games wins the reformation activity.
  - Curling: Each team has 5 of their players as slide stones and 2 pushing players. The team with its member nearer to the center wins the reformation activity.
- The Ladder That Carries The Correct Answers: In each round, Kim Tae-jin will say out a keyword, and upon hearing it, both teams will take their ladders and fit their bodies in it. The first team to hit the bell on their side gets to answer the terms related to the keyword, and each member of the team has to answer in 3 seconds. If not, the team will have to return to the bell and switch direction of the ladder (i.e. the team's order of answering is reversed), and the opposing team will be given the chance to answer. The first team to have all the members answered takes the round, and the first team to win 3 rounds wins the reformation activity.
- Walking To The Words: As Kim Tae-jin gives the signal to start the game, all members will move off to the character board and then move off again to Kim Tae-jin to answer a word that can be formed with the characters on the character board. The word has to be in the Standard Korean Language Dictionary. If Kim Tae-jin accepts the answer, these characters will be taken away from the character board and given to the player answering that word. If not, the player has to walk another round to get another chance of answering. The word answered cannot be accepted if the player in front has already taken the character which the word required. The team with more characters wins the reformation activity.

==== Individual ====
- Challenge Kong Kong Bell: In each round, Kim Tae-jin will read out a question (either multiple-choice or open-ended) and after it is read out, all players will ride on their bouncy balls and move to him. The player who reaches him first gets to answer first. If he/she gave the wrong answer, he/she has to hit his/her own head with the toy hammer before moving back and the player behind gets the chance to answer. The player who gives the correct answer gets an additional vote plus a specific food provided. This will be played for 7 questions.
- Delicious Chairs: All players will wear spectacles that require them to cross their eyes to be able to see, and dance to the music provided. When the signal is given, all players will move to the chairs (number is less than the players on the field) and attempt to sit on them. The players that did not manage to sit on the chairs are eliminated from the reformation activity and do not get to eat the food provided for the round. This will be played until it produces the top 3 players and the first placed player gets 3 votes, followed by 2 for the second placed player, and 1 for the third placed player.
- Box Shaman: All players will dance to the music provided and when the signal is given, all players will select the boxes that they want. They can exchange positions if they want. The boxes are either unbreakable or breakable (at times with cold water) upon sitting on them. The players who have sat on breakable boxes are eliminated from the reformation activity, and this will be played until it produces the top 3 players and the first placed player gets 3 votes, followed by 2 for the second placed player, and 1 for the third placed player.

== Cast ==
Name	Episode
Kim Tae-jin (Main host, non-playing cast)	1–26
Lee Soo-geun	1–26
Jung Hyung-don	1–26
Hwang Je-sung	1–26
Lee Sang-yeob	1–26
Jang Do-yeon	1–26
Kim Jong-min (Koyote)	1-26; absent for episodes 13-14
JB (GOT7)	1–24; absent for episodes 7-12, 19-22, 25-26
Seungkwan (Seventeen)	1–26; absent for episodes 7-10, 17-18, 21-24
Choi Ye-na (IZ*ONE)	1–22; absent for episodes 11-12, 19-20, 23-26
Han Bo-reum	5–26; absent for episodes 21-22

== Episodes ==
List of episodes (episode 1–26)

Ep.	Broadcast Date	Round #	Guest Player(s)	Teams (Note: Names shown in bold italic are the mafias)		Keyword	Arrested (Note: Arranged in the following order: 1st Voting Round 2nd Voting Round 3rd Voting Round Final Voting Round (2 names if 2 mafias still not arrested by this round))		Final Custody Money Distribution	Results
1	March 16	1	An Yu-jin (IZ*ONE)	Honesty Class: Lee Soo-geun; Hwang Je-sung; Jang Do-yeon; Seungkwan; Choi Ye-na	Diligence Class: Jung Hyung-don; Kim Jong-min; Lee Sang-yeob; JB; An Yu-jin	Sports Competition (운동회)	Seungkwan; Jung Hyung-don; Kim Jong-min; Lee Sang-yeob		Honesty Class: ₩0; Diligence Class: ₩0; Mafias: ₩9,000,000 (Note: To be divided equally between the 3 mafias)	Mafias win Choi Ye-na was not arrested
2	March 23	1	An Yu-jin (IZ*ONE)	Honesty Class: Lee Soo-geun; Hwang Je-sung; Jang Do-yeon; Seungkwan; Choi Ye-na	Diligence Class: Jung Hyung-don; Kim Jong-min; Lee Sang-yeob; JB; An Yu-jin	Sports Competition (운동회)	Seungkwan; Jung Hyung-don; Kim Jong-min; Lee Sang-yeob		Honesty Class: ₩0; Diligence Class: ₩0; Mafias: ₩9,000,000	Mafias win Choi Ye-na was not arrested
3	March 30	2	An Yu-jin (IZ*ONE)	Honesty Class: Lee Soo-geun; Jung Hyung-don; Hwang Je-sung; Jang Do-yeon; An Yu-jin	Diligence Class: Kim Jong-min; Lee Sang-yeob; JB; Seungkwan; Choi Ye-na	Diet (다이어트)	Hwang Je-sung; Lee Soo-geun; Kim Jong-min; JB (Note: One of the top 2 most voted players in the final voting round); Seungkwan		Honesty Class: ₩3,000,000 (Note: To be divided equally between the 4 remaining model prisoners in the team); Diligence Class: ₩6,000,000 (Note: To be divided equally between the 3 remaining model prisoners in the team); Mafias: ₩0	Model Prisoners win All mafias were arrested
4	April 6	2	An Yu-jin (IZ*ONE)	Honesty Class: Lee Soo-geun; Jung Hyung-don; Hwang Je-sung; Jang Do-yeon; An Yu-jin	Diligence Class: Kim Jong-min; Lee Sang-yeob; JB; Seungkwan; Choi Ye-na	Diet (다이어트)	Hwang Je-sung; Lee Soo-geun; Kim Jong-min; JB; Seungkwan		Honesty Class: ₩3,000,000; Diligence Class: ₩6,000,000; Mafias: ₩0	Model Prisoners win All mafias were arrested
5	April 13	3	—N/a	Honesty Class: Lee Soo-geun; Kim Jong-min; Jang Do-yeon; Han Bo-reum; JB	Diligence Class: Jung Hyung-don; Hwang Je-sung; Lee Sang-yeob; Seungkwan; Choi Ye-na	Jeju Island (제주도)	Jang Do-yeon; Jung Hyung-don; Han Bo-reum		Honesty Class: ₩3,000,000; Diligence Class: ₩6,000,000; Mafias: ₩0	Model Prisoners win All mafias were arrested
6	April 20	3	—N/a	Honesty Class: Lee Soo-geun; Kim Jong-min; Jang Do-yeon; Han Bo-reum; JB	Diligence Class: Jung Hyung-don; Hwang Je-sung; Lee Sang-yeob; Seungkwan; Choi Ye-na	Jeju Island (제주도)	Jang Do-yeon; Jung Hyung-don; Han Bo-reum		Honesty Class: ₩3,000,000; Diligence Class: ₩6,000,000; Mafias: ₩0	Model Prisoners win All mafias were arrested
7	April 27	4	Defconn; Shownu (Monsta X)	Honesty Class: Lee Soo-geun; Hwang Je-sung; Choi Ye-na; Defconn; Shownu	Diligence Class: Jung Hyung-don; Kim Jong-min; Lee Sang-yeob; Jang Do-yeon; Han Bo-reum	Parents' Day (어버이날)	Lee Sang-yeob; Choi Ye-na; Han Bo-reum; Shownu		Honesty Class: ₩0; Diligence Class: ₩0; Mafias: ₩9,000,000	Mafias win Kim Jong-min was not arrested
8	May 4	4	Defconn; Shownu (Monsta X)	Honesty Class: Lee Soo-geun; Hwang Je-sung; Choi Ye-na; Defconn; Shownu	Diligence Class: Jung Hyung-don; Kim Jong-min; Lee Sang-yeob; Jang Do-yeon; Han Bo-reum	Parents' Day (어버이날)	Lee Sang-yeob; Choi Ye-na; Han Bo-reum; Shownu		Honesty Class: ₩0; Diligence Class: ₩0; Mafias: ₩9,000,000	Mafias win Kim Jong-min was not arrested
9	May 11	5	GOT7 (Mark Tuan, BamBam)	Honesty Class: Kim Jong-min; Lee Sang-yeob; Jang Do-yeon; Choi Ye-na; Mark	Diligence Class: Lee Soo-geun; Jung Hyung-don; Hwang Je-sung; Han Bo-reum; BamBam	Live Broadcast (생방송)	Lee Soo-geun; Jung Hyung-don; Han Bo-reum; Jang Do-yeon		Honesty Class: ₩4,000,000; Diligence Class: ₩5,000,000; Mafias: ₩0	Model Prisoners win All mafias were arrested
10	May 18	5	GOT7 (Mark Tuan, BamBam)	Honesty Class: Kim Jong-min; Lee Sang-yeob; Jang Do-yeon; Choi Ye-na; Mark	Diligence Class: Lee Soo-geun; Jung Hyung-don; Hwang Je-sung; Han Bo-reum; BamBam	Live Broadcast (생방송)	Lee Soo-geun; Jung Hyung-don; Han Bo-reum; Jang Do-yeon		Honesty Class: ₩4,000,000; Diligence Class: ₩5,000,000; Mafias: ₩0	Model Prisoners win All mafias were arrested
11	May 25	6	Jeonghan (Seventeen); Sejeong (Gugudan)	Honesty Class: Lee Soo-geun; Jung Hyung-don; Jang Do-yeon; Han Bo-reum; Sejeong	Diligence Class: Kim Jong-min; Hwang Je-sung; Lee Sang-yeob; Seungkwan; Jeonghan	Vacation (방학)	Seungkwan; Han Bo-reum; Jung Hyung-don; Sejeong		Honesty Class: ₩4,000,000; Diligence Class: ₩5,000,000; Mafias: ₩0	Model Prisoners win All mafias were arrested
12	June 1	6	Jeonghan (Seventeen); Sejeong (Gugudan)	Honesty Class: Lee Soo-geun; Jung Hyung-don; Jang Do-yeon; Han Bo-reum; Sejeong	Diligence Class: Kim Jong-min; Hwang Je-sung; Lee Sang-yeob; Seungkwan; Jeonghan	Vacation (방학)	Seungkwan; Han Bo-reum; Jung Hyung-don; Sejeong		Honesty Class: ₩4,000,000; Diligence Class: ₩5,000,000; Mafias: ₩0	Model Prisoners win All mafias were arrested
13	June 8	7	JooE (Momoland)	Honesty Class: Lee Soo-geun; Hwang Je-sung; Jang Do-yeon; Choi Ye-na; JooE	Diligence Class: Jung Hyung-don; Lee Sang-yeob; Han Bo-reum; JB; Seungkwan	Part Time Job (아르바이트)	Lee Soo-geun; Seungkwan; Han Bo-reum; JooE		Honesty Class: ₩0; Diligence Class: ₩0; Mafias: ₩9,000,000	Mafias win Hwang Je-sung was not arrested
14	June 15	7	JooE (Momoland)	Honesty Class: Lee Soo-geun; Hwang Je-sung; Jang Do-yeon; Choi Ye-na; JooE	Diligence Class: Jung Hyung-don; Lee Sang-yeob; Han Bo-reum; JB; Seungkwan	Part Time Job (아르바이트)	Lee Soo-geun; Seungkwan; Han Bo-reum; JooE		Honesty Class: ₩0; Diligence Class: ₩0; Mafias: ₩9,000,000	Mafias win Hwang Je-sung was not arrested
Ep.	Broadcast Date	Round #	Guest Player(s)	Teams		Keyword	Mafia Death Note Used On	Arrested (Note: For episodes 25 and 26, the players arrested are in the following order: 1st Voting Round 2nd Voting Round Final Voting Round (2/3 names if 2/3 mafias still not arrested by this round))	Final Custody Money Distribution	Results
15	June 22	8	Red Velvet (Seulgi, Joy)	Honesty Class: Jung Hyung-don; Kim Jong-min; Jang Do-yeon; Seungkwan; Seulgi; Joy	Diligence Class: Lee Soo-geun; Hwang Je-sung; Lee Sang-yeob; Han Bo-reum; JB; Choi Ye-na	Hometown (고향)	Kim Jong-min	JB; Jung Hyung-don; Choi Ye-na; Seulgi	Honesty Class: ₩6,000,000; Diligence Class: ₩3,000,000 (Note: To be divided equally between the 5 remaining model prisoners in the team); Mafias: ₩0	Model Prisoners win All mafias were arrested
16	June 29	8	Red Velvet (Seulgi, Joy)	Honesty Class: Jung Hyung-don; Kim Jong-min; Jang Do-yeon; Seungkwan; Seulgi; Joy	Diligence Class: Lee Soo-geun; Hwang Je-sung; Lee Sang-yeob; Han Bo-reum; JB; Choi Ye-na	Hometown (고향)	Kim Jong-min	JB; Jung Hyung-don; Choi Ye-na; Seulgi	Honesty Class: ₩6,000,000; Diligence Class: ₩3,000,000; Mafias: ₩0	Model Prisoners win All mafias were arrested
17	July 6	9	Park Ha-sun; Jinyoung (GOT7); Jang Gyu-ri (fromis 9)	Honesty Class: Hwang Je-sung; Lee Sang-yeob; Jang Do-yeon; JB; Jinyoung; Jang Gyu-ri	Diligence Class: Lee Soo-geun; Jung Hyung-don; Kim Jong-min; Han Bo-reum; Choi Ye-na; Park Ha-sun	Hobby (취미)	Lee Soo-geun	Kim Jong-min; Hwang Je-sung; Jung Hyung-don; Lee Sang-yeob; Park Ha-sun	Honesty Class: ₩0; Diligence Class: ₩0; Mafias: ₩9,000,000	Mafias win Jang Do-yeon was not arrested
18	July 13	9	Park Ha-sun; Jinyoung (GOT7); Jang Gyu-ri (fromis 9)	Honesty Class: Hwang Je-sung; Lee Sang-yeob; Jang Do-yeon; JB; Jinyoung; Jang Gyu-ri	Diligence Class: Lee Soo-geun; Jung Hyung-don; Kim Jong-min; Han Bo-reum; Choi Ye-na; Park Ha-sun	Hobby (취미)	Lee Soo-geun	Kim Jong-min; Hwang Je-sung; Jung Hyung-don; Lee Sang-yeob; Park Ha-sun	Honesty Class: ₩0; Diligence Class: ₩0; Mafias: ₩9,000,000	Mafias win Jang Do-yeon was not arrested
19	July 20	10	Jang Su-won (Sechs Kies); WINNER (Kim Jin-woo, Song Min-ho); Ha Sung-woon (HOTSHOT)	Honesty Class: Kim Jong-min; Jang Do-yeon; Seungkwan; Jang Su-won; Kim Jin-woo; Song Min-ho	Diligence Class: Lee Soo-geun; Jung Hyung-don; Hwang Je-sung; Lee Sang-yeob; Han Bo-reum; Ha Sung-woon	Trend (유행)	Ha Sung-woon	Lee Sang-yeob; Kim Jin-woo; Hwang Je-sung; Han Bo-reum; Jang Do-yeon	Honesty Class: ₩3,000,000; Diligence Class: ₩6,000,000; Mafias: ₩0	Model Prisoners win All mafias were arrested
20	July 27	10	Jang Su-won (Sechs Kies); WINNER (Kim Jin-woo, Song Min-ho); Ha Sung-woon (HOTSHOT)	Honesty Class: Kim Jong-min; Jang Do-yeon; Seungkwan; Jang Su-won; Kim Jin-woo; Song Min-ho	Diligence Class: Lee Soo-geun; Jung Hyung-don; Hwang Je-sung; Lee Sang-yeob; Han Bo-reum; Ha Sung-woon	Trend (유행)	Ha Sung-woon	Lee Sang-yeob; Kim Jin-woo; Hwang Je-sung; Han Bo-reum; Jang Do-yeon	Honesty Class: ₩3,000,000; Diligence Class: ₩6,000,000; Mafias: ₩0	Model Prisoners win All mafias were arrested
21	August 3	11	ITZY	Honesty Class: Lee Soo-geun; Jung Hyung-don; Hwang Je-sung; Lee Sang-yeob; Jang Do-yeon; Lia	Diligence Class: Kim Jong-min; Choi Ye-na; Yeji; Ryujin; Chaeryeong; Yuna	Saturday (토요일)	Chaeryeong	Lee Sang-yeob; Kim Jong-min; Choi Ye-na; Yuna	Honesty Class: ₩4,000,000; Diligence Class: ₩5,000,000; Mafias: ₩0	Model Prisoners win All mafias were arrested
22	August 10	11	ITZY	Honesty Class: Lee Soo-geun; Jung Hyung-don; Hwang Je-sung; Lee Sang-yeob; Jang Do-yeon; Lia	Diligence Class: Kim Jong-min; Choi Ye-na; Yeji; Ryujin; Chaeryeong; Yuna	Saturday (토요일)	Chaeryeong	Lee Sang-yeob; Kim Jong-min; Choi Ye-na; Yuna	Honesty Class: ₩4,000,000; Diligence Class: ₩5,000,000; Mafias: ₩0	Model Prisoners win All mafias were arrested
23	August 17	12	Lee Jin-ho; Hwang Kwang-hee (ZE:A); Weki Meki (Choi Yoo-jung, Kim Do-yeon)	Honesty Class: Lee Soo-geun; Jung Hyung-don; Kim Jong-min; Hwang Je-sung; Han Bo-reum; Lee Jin-ho	Diligence Class: Lee Sang-yeob; Jang Do-yeon; JB; Hwang Kwang-hee; Choi Yoo-jung; Kim Do-yeon	Market (시장)	Lee Soo-geun	Lee Jin-ho; Choi Yoo-jung; Hwang Kwang-hee; Han Bo-reum	Honesty Class: ₩0; Diligence Class: ₩0; Mafias: ₩9,000,000	Mafias win Kim Do-yeon was not arrested
24	August 24	12	Lee Jin-ho; Hwang Kwang-hee (ZE:A); Weki Meki (Choi Yoo-jung, Kim Do-yeon)	Honesty Class: Lee Soo-geun; Jung Hyung-don; Kim Jong-min; Hwang Je-sung; Han Bo-reum; Lee Jin-ho	Diligence Class: Lee Sang-yeob; Jang Do-yeon; JB; Hwang Kwang-hee; Choi Yoo-jung; Kim Do-yeon	Market (시장)	Lee Soo-geun	Lee Jin-ho; Choi Yoo-jung; Hwang Kwang-hee; Han Bo-reum	Honesty Class: ₩0; Diligence Class: ₩0; Mafias: ₩9,000,000	Mafias win Kim Do-yeon was not arrested
25	August 31	13	Ha Sung-woon (HOTSHOT) (Note: Appears as the show's intern); X1 (Kim Woo-seok, Kim Yo-han, Song Hyeong-jun)	Honesty Class: Kim Jong-min; Jang Do-yeon; Seungkwan; Ha Sung-woon; Kim Woo-seok; Song Hyeong-jun	Diligence Class: Lee Soo-geun; Jung Hyung-don; Hwang Je-sung; Lee Sang-yeob; Han Bo-reum; Kim Yo-han	Seoul (서울)	—N/a	Hwang Je-sung; Kim Jong-min; Seungkwan (Note: One of the top 3 most voted players in the final voting round); Song Hyeong-jun; Kim Woo-seok	—N/a	Model Prisoners win All mafias were arrested
26	September 7	14	Kim Dong-hyun; Moon Se-yoon; Lee Jin-ho; Ha Sung-woon (HOTSHOT); Seventeen (Hoshi, Vernon)	Honesty Class: Lee Soo-geun; Jung Hyung-don; Lee Sang-yeob; Seungkwan; Lee Jin-ho; Hoshi; Vernon	Diligence Class: Kim Jong-min; Hwang Je-sung; Jang Do-yeon; Han Bo-reum; Kim Dong-hyun; Moon Se-yoon; Ha Sung-woon	Package Tour (패키지 여행)	Lee Sang-yeob; Vernon	Ha Sung-woon; Moon Se-yoon; Jung Hyung-don	Honesty Class: ₩0; Diligence Class: ₩0; Mafias: ₩9,000,000	Mafias win Seungkwan and Kim Dong-hyun were not arrested

== Statistics ==
Statistics recorded as of the end of Round 14.

Times Roles Played

Cast Players
Name	Rounds Played	No. of Times Played As Model Prisoner	No. of Times Played As Mafia
Lee Soo-geun	14	11	3
Jung Hyung-don	14	12	2
Kim Jong-min	13	11	2
Hwang Je-sung	14	12	2
Lee Sang-yeob	14	12	2
Jang Do-yeon	14	10	4
Han Bo-reum	11	6	5
JB	7	5	2
Seungkwan	9	4	5
Choi Ye-na	9	6	3

Win/Loss Record

Model Prisoners	Mafia
8	6

Cast Players
Rank #	Name	Rounds Played	Win/Loss Record		
Rank #	Name	Rounds Played	Rounds Won	Rounds Lost	Win %
1	Kim Jong-min	13	10	3	76.9%
2	Hwang Je-sung	14	10	4	71.4%
3	Choi Ye-na	9	6	3	66.7%
4	Lee Sang-yeob	14	8	6	57.1%
5	Seungkwan	9	5	4	55.6%
6	Lee Soo-geun	14	7	7	50%
7	Jang Do-yeon	14	6	8	42.9%
7	Jung Hyung-don	14	6	8	42.9%
9	Han Bo-reum	11	3	8	27.3%
10	JB	7	1	6	14.3%

Guest Players
Round #	Name	Round Won/Lost
1	An Yu-jin	Lost
2	An Yu-jin	Won
4	Defconn	Lost
4	Shownu	Lost
5	Mark	Won
5	BamBam	Won
6	Jeonghan	Won
6	Sejeong	Lost
7	JooE	Lost
8	Seulgi	Lost
8	Joy	Won
9	Park Ha-sun	Won
9	Jinyoung	Lost
9	Jang Gyu-ri	Lost
10	Jang Su-won	Won
10	Kim Jin-woo	Lost
10	Song Min-ho	Won
10	Ha Sung-woon	Won
11	Yeji	Won
11	Lia	Won
11	Ryujin	Won
11	Chaeryeong	Won
11	Yuna	Lost
12	Lee Jin-ho	Won
12	Hwang Kwang-hee	Lost
12	Choi Yoo-jung	Won
12	Kim Do-yeon	Won
13	Ha Sung-woon	Won
13	Kim Woo-seok	Lost
13	Kim Yo-han	Won
13	Song Hyeong-jun	Lost
14	Kim Dong-hyun	Won
14	Moon Se-yoon	Lost
14	Lee Jin-ho	Lost
14	Ha Sung-woon	Won
14	Hoshi	Lost
14	Vernon	Lost

Custody Money Earned

Cast Players
Rank	Name	Rounds Played	Total Custody Money Earned
1	Kim Jong-min	13	₩14,750,000
2	Hwang Je-sung	14	₩13,766,667
3	Choi Ye-na	9	₩11,100,000
4	Lee Sang-yeob	14	₩10,550,000
5	Seungkwan	9	₩9,750,000
6	Lee Soo-geun	14	₩7,833,333
7	Jang Do-yeon	14	₩7,383,333
8	Jung Hyung-don	14	₩5,750,000
9	Han Bo-reum	11	₩3,600,000
10	JB	7	₩1,000,000

Guest Players
Round #	Name	Total Custody Money Earned
1	An Yu-jin	₩0
2	An Yu-jin	₩750,000
4	Defconn	₩0
4	Shownu	₩0
5	Mark	₩1,000,000
5	BamBam	₩1,666,667
6	Jeonghan	₩1,250,000
6	Sejeong	₩0
7	JooE	₩0
8	Seulgi	₩0
8	Joy	₩1,500,000
9	Park Ha-sun	₩3,000,000
9	Jinyoung	₩0
9	Jang Gyu-ri	₩0
10	Jang Su-won	₩750,000
10	Kim Jin-woo	₩0
10	Song Min-ho	₩750,000
10	Ha Sung-woon	₩1,200,000
11	Yeji	₩1,250,000
11	Lia	₩800,000
11	Ryujin	₩1,250,000
11	Chaeryeong	₩1,250,000
11	Yuna	₩0
12	Lee Jin-ho	₩3,000,000
12	Hwang Kwang-hee	₩0
12	Choi Yoo-jung	₩3,000,000
12	Kim Do-yeon	₩3,000,000
13	Ha Sung-woon	—N/a
13	Kim Woo-seok	₩0
13	Kim Yo-han	—N/a
13	Song Hyeong-jun	₩0
14	Kim Dong-hyun	₩3,000,000
14	Moon Se-yoon	₩0
14	Lee Jin-ho	₩0
14	Ha Sung-woon	₩3,000,000
14	Hoshi	₩0
14	Vernon	₩0

== Ratings ==
In the ratings below, the highest rating for the show will be in red and the lowest rating for the show will be in blue.

List of ratings (episode 1-26)

Ep.	Broadcast date	AGB Nielsen	
Ep.	Broadcast date	Nationwide	Seoul
1	March 16	2.106%	2.378%
2	March 23	1.576%	1.715%
3	March 30	1.412%	NR
4	April 6	1.303%	NR
5	April 13	1.201%	NR
6	April 20	1.319%	NR
7	April 27	1.666%	1.599%
8	May 4	1.452%	NR
9	May 11	1.424%	1.646%
10	May 18	1.712%	2.007%
11	May 25	1.273%	NR
12	June 1	1.448%	NR
13	June 8	1.032%	NR
14	June 15	1.194%	NR
15	June 22	1.237%	NR
16	June 29	1.649%	NR
17	July 6	1.345%	NR
18	July 13	1.746%	1.704%
19	July 20	1.622%	NR
20	July 27	1.348%	NR
21	August 3	1.238%	NR
22	August 10	1.639%	NR
23	August 17	1.438%	NR
24	August 24	1.256%	NR
25	August 31	1.781%	1.670%
26	September 7	1.675%	NR
