= Fighting (BSS song) =

2023 single by BSS featuring Lee Young-ji

Single by BSS featuring Lee Young-ji

from the album Second Wind
- Language: Korean
- Released: February 6, 2023
- Length: 3:24
- Label: Pledis; YG Plus
- Composers: Woozi; Bumzu; Hoshi; S.Coups; Park Gi-tae
- Lyricists: Woozi; Bumzu; Hoshi; DK; Seungkwan; Lee Young-ji

BSS singles chronology
"Just Do It" (2018)	"Fighting" (2023)	"CBZ (Prime Time)" (2025)

Music video
- "Fighting" on YouTube

"Fighting" (Korean: 파이팅 해야지) is a song recorded by BSS featuring Lee Young-ji. It was released on February 6, 2023, as the lead single of their first single album, Second Wind, which marked the group's first release in five years after their debut single "Just Do It". "Fighting" was written by Woozi, Bumzu, Hoshi, DK, Seungkwan, Lee Young-ji, S.Coups, and Park Gi-tae. The song topped the Billboard Japan Hot 100 and debuted at number five on South Korea's Circle Digital Chart. In the United States, it entered the top 10 of the World Digital Song Sales chart. BSS performed the track at the 12th Circle Chart Music Awards and on various South Korean music programs, winning eight music program awards.

== Background and release ==
The nickname BooSeokSoon (BSS) was coined for the trio formed by Seungkwan, DK, and Hoshi of the South Korean boy group Seventeen in 2013. BSS officially debuted as a sub-unit of the group in 2018 with their first single, "Just Do It". The song's "witty" lyrics were praised, alongside the group's lively performances. The unit was supposed to be a one-time project for Seventeen's fan meeting Caratland. After many requests from fans, BSS started planning a new album in 2022.

On February 1, 2023, BSS announced that they would release their first single album, Second Wind, with "Fighting" as its lead single. The song would feature South Korean rapper Lee Young-ji. A snippet of "Fighting" was previewed in a medley video ahead of its release. Two video teasers were posted on February 3 and 4. "Fighting" was released alongside an accompanying music video on February 6. A video of BSS dancing to the song in a gym wearing sportswear was posted on February 15.

In June 2024, "Fighting" was selected as the official cheer song for the South Korean team at the 2024 Paris Olympics.

== Composition ==
"Fighting" was composed by Woozi, Bumzu, Hoshi, S.Coups, Park Gi-tae, while the lyrics were written by Woozi, Bumzu, Hoshi, DK, Seungkwan, and Lee Young-ji. The anthem was described as an "up-tempo song with a cool drum sound on top of an exciting funk rhythm".

== Commercial performance ==
"Fighting" debuted at number five on South Korea's Circle Digital Chart in the issue dated February 5–11, 2023. That same week, it topped its component Download Chart. The song debuted at number one on the Billboard Japan Hot 100 in the chart issue dated February 15, 2023. In the United States, it debuted at number eight on the World Digital Song Sales in the chart issue dated February 18, 2023.

== Critical reception ==
Reviewers commended BSS for their positive and contagious energy, which also characterizes their work as Seventeen. Billboard's Jeff Benjamin said the song is "a perfect fit for three of Seventeen's most animated and energetic members". Yoon Sang-geun of Star News praised Lee's fast and energetic rap. Newsen's Lee Ha-na compared BSS' "charms and delightful concept" to After School's sub-unit Orange Caramel and WJSN's various sub-units. Lee also noted that the lyrics, though one-dimensional, resonated with the public thanks to their "cry of determination". Art Insight's Kim Yo-bin said "Fighting" aims to inspire the entire nation and recommended the song in particular to workers, likening the feeling of listening to it to a "cheerleader cheering for a cheerleading team".

== Live performances ==
The group first performed "Fighting" on the South Korean music program M Countdown with Lee Young-ji on February 9, 2023. They also performed the song on Music Bank and Inkigayo on February 10 and 12, 2023. BSS sang "Fighting" alongside "Just Do It" on February 18, 2023, at the 12th Circle Chart Music Awards, where they accepted the Male Group of the Year award and the Artist of the Year – Physical Album (4th Quarter) award on behalf of Seventeen.

== Accolades ==
Awards and nominations for "Fighting"
Award ceremony	Year	Category	Result	Ref.
Golden Disc Awards	2024	Digital Song Bonsang	Won	
Melon Music Awards	2023	Song of the Year	Nominated	

Music program awards for "Fighting"
Program	Date	Ref.
Inkigayo	February 19, 2023	
M Countdown	February 16, 2023	
M Countdown	February 23, 2023	
M Countdown	March 2, 2023	
Music Bank	February 17, 2023	
Show Champion	February 15, 2023	
Show! Music Core	February 18, 2023	
Show! Music Core	February 25, 2023	

== Charts ==
=== Weekly charts ===
Weekly chart performance
Chart (2023)	Peak position
Japan (Japan Hot 100)	1
Japan Digital Singles (Oricon)	8
Japan Streaming (Oricon)	7
South Korea (Circle)	5
US World Digital Song Sales (Billboard)	8

=== Monthly charts ===
Monthly chart performance
Chart (2023)	Position
South Korea (Circle)	6

=== Year-end charts ===
2023 year-end chart performance for "Fighting"
Chart (2023)	Position
South Korea (Circle)	19

2024 year-end chart performance for "Fighting"
Chart (2024)	Position
South Korea (Circle)	65

== Certifications ==
Certifications
Region	Certification	Certified units/sales
Streaming
Japan (RIAJ)	Gold	50,000,000^{†}
South Korea (KMCA)	Platinum	100,000,000^{†}
^{†} Streaming-only figures based on certification alone.

== Release history ==
Release history
Region	Date	Format	Label	Ref.
Various	February 6, 2023	Digital download; streaming	Pledis; YG Plus	
