= Five Cranky Brothers =

Television program

- Also known as: 5Bros
- Genre: Variety; Talk show
- Starring: Park Joon-hyung (g.o.d); Seo Jang-hoon; Kim Jong-kook; Lee Jin-hyuk (UP10TION); Seungkwan (Seventeen)
- Country of origin: South Korea
- Original language: Korean
- No. of seasons: 1
- No. of episodes: 13

Production
- Production location: South Korea
- Running time: 90 minutes

Original release
- Network: JTBC
- Release: September 12, 2019 – February 6, 2020

Five Cranky Brothers (Korean: 괴팍한 5형제) is a television program that aired on JTBC. It aired every Thursday at 23:00 (KST), starting from October 31, 2019. The show finished airing on February 6, 2020.

A pilot episode was aired on September 12, 2019, as a special program for Chuseok.

== Overview ==
A variety talk show where the five Brothers discuss and rank, in order, anything from our daily lives.

=== Format ===
Current

- Cranky Viewer's Request: Viewers can send in questions and options through the show's official website, and the Brothers would answer the selected questions by experimenting the options to rank them.
- Cranky Sorting: The Brothers would discuss and rank a topic with the given options provided from first to fifth. Battles of this segment with the guest sisters could also be held, where they have to guess the rankings of the given options from the topic to match the rankings based on a group of people (of varying demographics) that have been surveyed with the same question and the same given options.
- Cranky Neighbourhood Battle: The Brothers work together to battle with opponents from outside the Cranky House.

Former

- The Brothers would discuss and rank a topic with the given options provided. A Surprise Event is then held, and the Brothers have to guess the rankings of the given options from the previous question to match the rankings based on people that have been surveyed with the same question and the same given options. If the Brothers can get the Surprise Event question correctly guessed, they can get to eat food.
- A real life question/scenario is given by the Sisters and the Brothers each think of an answer/solution of their own (or can have the same answer when options are given). The Sisters will then rank the answers/solutions from first to fifth, with the best possible answer/solution for the Sisters ranked first and the remaining four Brothers would get hit by water from water cannons.
- Cranky Brothers' Test: 3 questions (related to the Brothers) are prepared and whoever gets all 3 correct would not get hit by the water from water cannons.

== Cast ==
=== Regular ===
- Park Joon-hyung (g.o.d) - Eldest brother
- Seo Jang-hoon - 2nd brother
- Kim Jong-kook - 3rd brother
- Lee Jin-hyuk (UP10TION) - 4th brother
- Seungkwan (Seventeen) - Youngest brother

=== Pilot ===
- Park Joon-hyung (g.o.d) - Eldest brother
- Seo Jang-hoon - 2nd brother
- Kim Jong-kook - 3rd brother
- Joo Woo-jae - 4th brother
- Baekhyun (EXO) - Youngest brother

== Episodes ==
=== 2019 ===
List of episodes in 2019 (episode 1–9)

| Ep. | Broadcast date | Guest(s) | Content | Note(s) |
|---|---|---|---|---|
| Pilot | September 12 | Kim So-eun | Youngest brother's room 1. Showering sequence (Note: Given: 1. Brush teeth; 2. Wash face; 3. Wash head; 4. Wash upper body; 5. Wash lower body); 2. Moments when humans find it hard to hold in (Note: Given: 1. Need to go to the toilet; 2. Hunger; 3. Fatigue; 4. Extreme temperatures; 5. Thirst); 3. Top sport stars (Note: Given: 1. Michael Jordan; 2. Tiger Woods; 3. Fedor Emelianenko; 4. Lionel Messi; 5. Usain Bolt); 4. Types of people that others do not want to converse with (Note: Given: 1. People who are passive; 2. People who curse without control; 3. People who only talks about himself/herself; 4. People who are full of bluff; 5. People who interrupt others talking) | Special voice appearance by Chen (EXO) through phone |
| 1 | October 31 | Min Kyung-hoon (Buzz); Jang Do-yeon; Mina (Gugudan) | Youngest brother's room Top Korean sport stars (Note: Given: 1. Park Chan-ho; 2. Pak Se-ri; 3. Park Ji-sung; 4. Kim Yeon-ah; 5. Seo Jang-hoon); Surprise Event: Rank based on the responses of people related to sports broadcasts Living room 1. Human relations (Note: Question: What can Jang Do-yeon do, given that she is alone with a person she meets for the first time, to prevent awkwardness?); 2. New acting role (Note: Question: What can Mina, who auditioned for a villain role, do, given when she wants to stop the director from walking out of the audition room due to unsatisfied acting from her?) | |
| 2 | November 7 | Eunhyuk (Super Junior); Brown Eyed Girls | Youngest brother's room Actions of one's boyfriend/girlfriend and his/her opposite close friend that one finds intolerable (Note: Given: 1. Drinking; 2. One day travel; 3. Karaoke; 4. Watch a movie; 5. Contacting each other everyday); Surprise Event: Rank based on the responses of the 20s Living room 1. Relations between seniors and juniors (Note: Question: What can Brown Eyed Girls do to get closer to their juniors, given when the former enters the latter's waiting room and the latter stops talking?); 2. Variety involvement (Note: Question: What can Gain do to get herself back involved in variety, given when she had undergone a 1-hour long recording without saying anything and the rest of her members reacting immediately?) | |
| 3 | November 14 | Hwang Chi-yeul; Solbi; Heo Young-ji | Youngest brother's room Wishes that one wants to come true (Note: Given: 1. Win a ₩10,000,000,000 lottery; 2. Look younger by 20 years; 3. Change one's own looks; 4. Health safeguarded for the rest of one's life; 5. Meeting one's eternal other half); Surprise Event: Rank based on the responses of parents in their 60s Living room 1. Personal broadcast (Note: Question: What content can Solbi and/or Heo Young-ji do on her personal broadcast program to get herself and her program more popular (i.e get more subscribers)?); 2. Party (Note: Question: What can Solbi do to change the cold atmosphere of her studio party, given that she thought it was her communication problems that caused it?) | |
| 4 | November 21 | Park So-hyun; Kang Seung-hyun | Cranky room Cranky Sorting: Moments when one feels disillusioned about his/her lover (rank based on the responses of the 20s and 30s) (Note: Given: 1. Using the wrong (Korean) grammar; 2. Farting or burping in public; 3. Showing off on his/her social media; 4. Being a Mother's boy/girl; 5. Too much joking around); Cranky Neighbourhood Battle (against 5 of the show's staff): Punching Bag Arcade Game; Living room Cranky Viewer's Request: Which of the following abilities does one want to have, if only one can be chosen? (Note: Given: 1. Eat and not gain weight; 2. Tirelessness; 3. Reading the minds of other people; 4. Memorising everything after just one look; 5. 100% success rate in confessions) | Seungkwan (Seventeen) joined the show starting from this episode |
| 5 | November 28 | Cosmic Girls (Bona, Exy, Luda, Dayoung); Forestella | Living room Worse roommate one can have (Note: Given: 1. One with bad sleeping habits; 2. One who doesn't clean the room much; 3. One who uses his/her roommate's towel mindlessly without permission; 4. One who has the opposite biorhythms as his/her roommate; 5. One who brings other people into the room); Cranky room Cranky Viewer's Request: Rank these 5 celebrities based on their fighting skills (based on the responses of fight club members) (Note: Given: 1. Kang Ho-dong; 2. Gary; 3. Julien Kang; 4. Ma Dong-seok; 5. Kim Jong-kook); Cranky Neighbourhood Battle (against Forestella): Karaoke | |
| 6 | December 5 | GFriend | Cranky Viewer's Request: Best place to place the hot pack on (Note: Given: 1. Foot; 2. Hand; 3. Back of the neck; 4. Back; 5. On the belly); Cranky Neighbourhood Battle (against GFriend): Hand quiz Cranky Sorting (battle against GFriend): Temptations that are hard to endure (Note: Given: 1. Snacking while on diet; 2. Contacted by friend while studying; 3. Impulsive buying while saving; 4. Using smartphone while working; 5. Going for a Hoesik while on abstinence from alcohol); Cranky Viewers's Request: Cranky but delicious food combinations (Note: Given: 1. Banana and kimchi; 2. Cola and rice; 3. Watermelon and ssamjang; 4. Cup ramyun and mayonnaise; 5. Vanilla ice cream and sesame oil) | |
| 7 | December 12 | Yoon Bo-ra; Soyou | Cranky Viewers's Request: Eat which part of the Bungeo-ppang first (Note: Given: 1. Head; 2. Tail; 3. Fin; 4. Abdomen; 5. Split in half and eat); Cranky Viewer's Request: What to eat first in a buffet (Note: Given: 1. Seafood (Sashimi, sushi, lobster, etc.); 2. Salad and/or soup; 3. Western/Chinese food (meat included); 4. Dessert (Bread, Tteok, fruits, etc.); 5. Korean food (rice, kimchi, soup, etc.)); Cranky Neighbourhood Battle (against the managers of the cast members): Memory; Cranky Sorting (battle against Bora + Soyou): Best method of running away from the pain from breaking up (Note: Given: 1. Crazily working; 2. Crazily crying; 3. Crazily spending money; 4. Crazily going on date meetings; 5. Crazily making appointments) | |
| 8 | December 19 | Oh My Girl (Hyojung, YooA, Seunghee, Binnie) | Cranky Viewer's Request: Best movement to do while memorising to improve memory in a very short time (Note: Given: 1. While clenching right fist: 2. While laughing out loudly; 3. While walking backwards; 4. While chewing a dried squid; 5. While dancing); Cranky Viewer's Request: Best Kimchi-jjigae (Note: Given: 1.Tuna kimchi-jjigae: 2. Ham kimchi-jjigae; 3. Pork kimchi-jjigae; 4. Mackerel pike kimchi-jjigae; 5. Normal kimchi-jjigae); Cranky Sorting (against Oh My Girl): Present that one hates to receive (based on the responses of kindergarten children) (Note: Given: 1. Food; 2. Complete collection of fairy tales; 3. Large sized clothes; 4. Kids Phone; 5. Stationery); Cranky Neighbourhood Battle (against Oh My Girl): Speed quiz | |
| 9 | December 26 | MAHEUN5 (Note: Project boy group that consists of comedians Heo Kyung-hwan, Park Young-jin, Kim Won-hyo, Park Sung-kwang and Kim Ji-ho) | Cranky Viewer's Request: Best fitness training at home (Note: Given: 1. Training without any equipment; 2. Training with a chin-up bar; 3. Training with an elastic band; 4. Training with a fitness ball); Cranky Neighbourhood Battle (against MAHEUN5): Co-operation to reach target weight + Imitations of photos Cranky Sorting (against MAHEUN5): Most detestable type of friend one can have (Note: Given: 1. One who is stingy; 2. One who only contacts when he/she needs urgent help; 3. One who has princess/prince sickness; 4. One who nags, pinpoints or admonishes; 5. One who suddenly changes in front of his/her ideal type) | Special appearance by Jeong Hyeong-don |

=== 2020 ===
List of episodes in 2020 (episode 10-12)

| Ep. | Broadcast date | Guest(s) | Content | Note(s) |
|---|---|---|---|---|
| 10 | January 2 | Rainbow | Cranky Viewer's Request: The item that cannot disappear from one's life (Note: Given: 1. Cider; 2. Kimchi; 3. Ice cream; 4. Ramyun; 5. Coffee); Cranky Viewer's Request: Fastest way to get rid of the spiciness in one's mouth (Note: Given: 1. Rest bread on one's tongue; 2. Eat lemon; 3. Hit the top of one's head; 4. Drink milk; 5. Gargle on olive oil); Cranky Neighbourhood Battle (against Rainbow): Hand quiz Cranky Sorting (against Rainbow): The destination that one wants to go for a honeymoon the most (Note: Given: 1. Paris (holiday style); 2. New York (city style); 3.Rome (touring style): 4. Iceland (adventure style); 5. Kenya (unique style)) | |
| — | No episode on January 9 due to the live broadcast of the 2020 AFC U-23 Championship between South Korea and China | | | |
| — | No episodes on January 16 and January 23 due to the broadcast of Two Yoo Project – Sugar Man Special: Yang Joon-il 91.19 | | | |
| 11 | January 30 | Don Spike; Muzie; Ravi (VIXX) | Cranky Viewer's Request: Cranky Food Special - Drinks and food that are made from cranky food combinations and have similar tastes to the originals (Note: Given: 1. Coffee milk (made from barley tea, milk and sugar); 2. Beer (made from oolong tea and carbonated water); 3. Misu (made from flour (fried in a pan), sugar and water); 4. Makgeolli (made from Morning Rice drink and Sprite); 5. Yogurt drink (made from Seolleongtang, Naengmyeon soup and sugar) (Note: Given: 1. Corn soup (made from pickled radish, bread and milk); 2. Salmon sushi (made from tangerine, seaweed and rice); 3. Soy sauce marinated crab (made from banana and coffee); 4. Pollack pancake (made from flour, eggs, rice and ramyeon soup powder); 5. Cheesecake (made from soft tofu and plain yogurt)); Cranky Neighbourhood Battle (against Don Spike, Muzie and Ravi): Park Joon-hyung's Cranky Speed Quiz; Cranky Sorting (against Don Spike, Muzie and Ravi): Best action star (based on the responses of 100 frequent cinema visitors) (Note: Given: 1. Sylvester Stallone; 2. Chow Yun-fat; 3. Jackie Chan; 4. Tom Cruise; 5. Robert Downey Jr.) | Seungkwan is absent |
| 12 | February 6 | Tony An (H.O.T.); Hong Yoon-hwa; Austin Kang; Han Hyun-min | Cranky Viewer's Request: Cranky Food Special - Cranky coffee combinations and cranky mains (Note: Given: 1. Cider added to coffee; 2. Peace iced tea added to coffee with extra shot; 3. Raw egg added to coffee; 4. Sugar and pepper added to coffee; 5. Chopped spicy chilli added to coffee) (Note: Given: 1. Porridge (made from rice crackers and water); 2. Stir-fried potato (made from potato chips and rice); 3. Samgyeopsal (made from Ace crackers and grilled kimchi); 4. Fried bacon (made from Oreo and bacon); 5. Pork rinds (made from dried pickled radish pan-fried)); Cranky Neighbourhood Battle (against Tony An, Hong Yoon-hwa, Austin Kang and Han Hyun-min): Park Joon-hyung and Austin Kang's Cranky Speed Quiz; Cranky Sorting: Moments of sadness when living alone (based on the responses of the 20s) (Note: Given: 1. Talking to oneself; 2. Returning to home alone; 3. Not enough hands (help); 4. When one is sick; 5. Never eat meals on time) | Seungkwan is absent |

== Ratings ==
In the ratings below, the highest rating for the show will be in red, and the lowest rating for the show will be in blue each year. Some of the ratings found have already been rounded off to 1 decimal place, as they are usually of lower rankings in terms of the day's ratings.

=== 2019 ===
List of episodes in 2019 (episode 1–9)

| Ep. # | Broadcast date | Average audience share |
| Ep. # | Broadcast date | AGB Nielsen |
| Ep. # | Broadcast date | Nationwide |
|---|---|---|
| Pilot | September 12 | — |
| 1 | October 31 | 0.978% |
| 2 | November 7 | 0.673% |
| 3 | November 14 | 0.714% |
| 4 | November 21 | 0.650% |
| 5 | November 28 | 0.822% |
| 6 | December 5 | 0.627% |
| 7 | December 12 | 0.553% |
| 8 | December 19 | 0.712% |
| 9 | December 26 | 0.713% |

=== 2020 ===
List of episodes in 2020 (episode 10-12)

| Ep. # | Broadcast date | Average audience share |
| Ep. # | Broadcast date | AGB Nielsen |
| Ep. # | Broadcast date | Nationwide |
|---|---|---|
| 10 | January 2 | 0.716% |
| 11 | January 30 | 0.377% |
| 12 | February 6 | 0.360% |
