= Peder Elias =

- Born: Peder Elias Eriksrud Kjørholt; 14 January 1997 (age 29)
- Origin: Trondheim, Norway
- Genres: Pop
- Occupation: Singer-songwriter
- Years active: 2018–present

Peder Elias Eriksrud Kjørholt (born 14 January 1997) is a Norwegian singer-songwriter. He debuted in 2018 and released his first album, Love & Loneliness, in 2022. As a child, he sang in the Nidaros Cathedral Men and Boys' choir.

At the 2023 Spellemannprisen, Elias won the Spellemann Award for International Success of the Year for exporting Norwegian music in 2022.

== Discography ==
=== Albums ===
- Love & Loneliness (2022)

=== Charted songs ===
Title	Year	Peak chart positions				Album
Title	Year	KOR	NOR	NZ Hot	US World	Album
"Loving You Girl" (feat. Hkeem)	2021	111	—	—	—	Love & Loneliness
"When I'm Still Getting Over You" (feat. Paige)	2022	—	—	39	—	Love & Loneliness
"7PM" (7시에 들어줘) (BSS feat. Peder Elias)	2023	49	—	—	13	Second Wind
"Paper Plane"	2023	— (Note: "Paper Plane" did not enter the Circle Digital Chart, but peaked at number 106 on the component Download Chart.)	—	—	—	Non-album single
"Who I Am" (with Alan Walker and Putri Ariani)	2024	—	18	—	—	Walkerworld 2.0
"Hey Hello" (with. Cha Eun-woo)	2024	— (Note: "Hey Hello" did not enter the Circle Digital Chart, but peaked at number 73 on the component Download Chart.)	—	—	—	Non-album single

== Awards and nominations ==
Award	Year	Category	Nominee	Result	Ref.
Genie Music Awards	2022	Best Pop Artist	Peder Elias	Won	
Spellemannprisen	2023	International Success of the Year	Peder Elias	Won	
