= Asia (2024 TV series) =

2024 British nature documentary television series

- Genre: Nature documentary
- Narrated by: David Attenborough
- Composers: Jacob Shea; Laurentia Editha
- Country of origin: United Kingdom
- Original language: English
- No. of episodes: 7

Production
- Executive producer: Roger Webb
- Producer: Matthew Wright
- Running time: 7x60 minutes
- Production company: BBC Studios Natural History Unit

Original release
- Network: BBC One; BBC One HD
- Release: 3 November – 15 December 2024

Asia is a 2024 British television series co-produced by the BBC Studios Natural History Unit, BBC America, ZDF and France Télévisions. It focuses on wildlife and wild habitats in Asia, and was four years in the making. It consists of seven hour-long episodes. The series was filmed in 120 shoots in 24 countries, including the Philippines, Indonesia, Sri Lanka, Egypt, Israel, Russia, Japan, Nepal, Thailand, India, Oman, Pakistan, China, Malaysia, Iraq, Taiwan, Vietnam, Singapore, Mongolia, Iran, the United Arab Emirates, Bahrain, Uzbekistan and Hong Kong.

== Episodes ==
No.	Title	Produced by	Original release date	UK viewers (millions)
1	"Beneath the Waves"	Mark Wheeler	3 November 2024	8.0
The sea bunny Asia has the longest coastline of all of the continents. This first episode focuses on Asia's marine habitats. In the Philippine Sea, Moorish idols must run the gauntlet of grey reef sharks as they swim away from the reef and out into the open ocean in order to spawn, a spectacle never filmed before. The Indonesian Throughflow is an important ocean current that runs through Indonesia. In Komodo National Park, it creates large whirlpools, which benefit reef manta rays as they bring plankton to the surface for the mantas to feed on. The mantas also visit a cleaning station, where sunburst butterflyfish remove parasites from their bodies. Ujung Kulon National Park in Java is home to large tracts of mangroves, where a dusky-gilled mudskipper looks for a mate. In the western Indian Ocean, many objects and animals, such as jellyfish, float in the current. A sperm whale calf plays with a mangrove seed and practises the art of hanging vertically in the water to sleep. At the westernmost edge of Asia, the Suez Canal is a major shipping passage from the Red Sea into the Mediterranean Sea. At Israel's Orot Rabin power station, warm water pumped into the sea speeds up the development of unborn dusky sharks, and pregnant female sharks congregate there in large numbers. This had never been filmed before. On Tyuleniy Island in the Russian Sea of Okhotsk, a large colony of northern fur seals gathers at a former hunting settlement. The bulls fight for territory, and many pups are crushed to death or injured as they do so. Offshore, orcas hunt the adult seals. Deep-sea life in the Philippine Sea includes the barrel amphipod, which makes its home inside the bodies of salps. These creatures undergo a vertical migration every night. In Japan's Toyama Bay, firefly squid rise up from the depths to breed at the surface, before they all die. The Coral Triangle is home to many hundreds of species of marine life. The poisonous diet of the sea bunny protects it from predators. The episode ends with a mass congregation of black-banded sea kraits and bluefin trevally hunting together in partnership. Asia: On Location shows the film crew's efforts to film the whirlpools in Komodo National Park.
2	"Above the Clouds"	Sara Douglas	10 November 2024	6.9
Two young Yunnan snub-nosed monkeys This episode focuses on the mountains and high-altitude regions of Asia, and the plants and animals that have adapted to survive there. The episode opens with Mount Everest, before moving to the lusher mountains of Southeast Asia. Tham Nam Lod Cave in Thailand's Daen Lao Range is home to a quarter of a million Cook's swifts. The swifts fight for the best nesting sites, and some are knocked into the water, where they fall prey to hungry catfish and carp, a phenomenon never documented by science before now. On Borneo's Mount Kinabalu, pitcher plants feed on insects, but some are visited by mountain treeshrews and feed on their droppings instead. In the Western Ghats of India, Indian elephants live alongside humans. The elephants visit tea plantations, but they do not eat the tea; instead they eat the weeds growing among the plants and so help the humans. Some of these elephants travel high into the mountains in search of food. In the Dhofar Mountains of Oman, the Khareef transforms the desert into a lush cloud forest, providing opportunities for animals such as the Arabian chameleon, stalk-eyed fly and Dhofar toad. Dromedary camels also take advantage of the change in vegetation. In Pakistan, the mountains of the Hindu Kush provide a home for Astor markhor, which are shown battling for mates and courting females. Nepal is home to eight of the top ten highest mountains on earth. On the forested slopes of the Himalaya lives the red panda, and Yunnan snub-nosed monkeys live in China's Hengduan Mountains. Tibetan foxes use domestic yak as cover to hunt plateau pikas near the Tibetan village of Shanglaxiu. This behaviour had never been filmed before. The meltwater of the Himalayas feeds major rivers such as the Ganges and Indus, but due to anthropogenic climate change, this meltwater is now unpredictable. The village of Samdzong in the Mustang Caves region of Nepal used to be fed by a river that has now all but disappeared and the village is now almost deserted. The episode ends by showing the courtship behaviour of snow leopards, filmed in Himachal Pradesh. Asia: On Location shows how the crew managed to film the Tibetan foxes of Shanglaxiu.
3	"The Frozen North"	Henry M Mix	17 November 2024	6.3
A red fox on Hokkaido sea ice Over half of Asia freezes during the winter. The third episode of Asia is about these colder regions, focusing mainly on Siberia and Hokkaido. Winter in Lake Baikal creates odd shapes out of the ice. As the spring melt begins, a nerpa pup must travel to the edge of the ice sheet, but it can only hold its breath for a few minutes. To assist it, its mother blows bubbles to create air pockets under the ice for the pup to breathe, the first time this extraordinary behaviour has been documented. In Hokkaido, Japan, diamond dust forms by a hot spring, where red-crowned cranes dance to impress their mates. The Tibetan Plateau is home to the Himalayan wolf, which is filmed hunting chiru for the first time. The boreal forest stretches right across the north of Asia, and in the forests where Russia, China, and North Korea meet, animals grow very large to withstand the cold. Ussuri boars grow to the size of bears, and Amur tigers are the world's largest cats. The world's largest owl, Blakiston's fish owl, also lives here, and a pair is filmed hunting fish to feed their chick. Smaller birds find it much harder to survive in cold regions. In Hokkaido, shima-enaga rely on sap icicles that form when Yezo sikas strip the bark off Japanese maple trees. Russia's Kamchatka Peninsula is home to one of the largest concentrations of volcanoes anywhere in the world. A female Kamchatka brown bear hunts sockeye salmon to feed her two cubs, but one of the cubs is struggling. In parts of Siberia, temperatures are colder than in much of Antarctica. Freezing winds blow southeast to Hokkaido. The Ussuri tube-nosed bat is the only bat that hibernates beneath the snow, and when spring arrives, it wakes up and flies away. This behaviour had never been filmed before. An Ezo red fox has learned to exploit fisherfolk on the sea ice around Hokkaido. As the humans fish for Japanese anchovies, less desirable fish such as starry flounders are discarded, providing an opportunity for the fox. However, large numbers of black-eared kites, white-tailed eagles and even Steller's sea eagles, the largest of all eagles, gather to take advantage of the fish as well, and the fox must outsmart them to gain a meal. In the Russian Arctic Ocean, starving polar bears find shelter in an abandoned Soviet weather station. Asia: On Location shows the efforts to film rutting chiru in Tibet, and the serendipitous discovery of the wolf hunt.
4	"Tangled Worlds"	Patrick Evans	24 November 2024	6.5
The "vertical forest" of Zhangjiajie Asia has more forests than any other continent, with one trillion trees. This episode shows the wildlife of Asia’s forests, with a major focus on breeding and parental behaviours. In the open forests of Nepal’s monsoon region, at the base of the Himalaya, lives one of the highest densities of Bengal tigers anywhere in the world. Alongside mating behaviour, a family is shown hunting Indian hog deer, Indian boars, Indian peafowl and chital. Elsewhere in Nepal live greater one-horned rhinoceros. These are shown fighting for mates, wallowing in pools, and courting. When the monsoon rains reach Kerala, purple frogs emerge from underground to breed. In Borneo, a female Bornean orangutan goes looking for a mate, before falling pregnant and giving birth. A large herd of Bornean pygmy elephants must cross the crocodile-infested Kinabatangan River to reach a palm oil plantation, where they feed on the African oil palms and destroy the electric fences designed to keep them out. Across the Karimata Strait, in Sumatra, the monstrous titan arum attracts carrion beetles to pollinate it. Iraq is a country known more for its minefields than for its forests, but the Kurdish oak and pistachio forests of the north are home to a wide variety of animals, such as the Indian crested porcupine and Anatolian boars. Predators of this region that are shown include the Asiatic wildcat and striped hyena. A family of Persian leopards are filmed for the first time ever in Iraq. On the other side of the continent lie the temperate and subtropical forests of east Asia. In Zhangjiajie, an odd “vertical forest” grows upon tall pillars of rock. In Taiwan, yellow-legged hornets hunt eastern honeybees to feed their young, but are themselves under threat from crested honey buzzards. In China’s Wolong Nature Reserve, a giant panda cub learns to climb trees. Asia: On Location shows the crew filming in Iraqi Kurdistan.
5	"Crowded Continent"	Emma Hatherley	1 December 2024	6.3
A water monitor feeding on a fish head in Bangkok's Lumphini Park Asia is home to more humans than all other continents combined, and its population is still increasing rapidly. Episode five shows wildlife that has adapted to live in landscapes that have been created by humans. The episode's introduction takes place in Vietnam, where the human population has doubled in the last fifty years. In the city of Bhopal, India, a mother Bengal tiger raises her four cubs. Sri Lankan elephants take food from vehicles passing by a road. One male, known as "Raja", has learned to stop traffic to demand food. Nara, Japan is home to large numbers of Japanese sikas, which are allowed to live alongside humans due to ancient beliefs. In the rutting season, the males' antlers are removed to avoid human injury. India has the largest human population in the world, and half of its population works in agriculture. In the Himalayan village of Siroli in Uttarakhand, Nepal grey langurs raid millet crops, but are under threat from domestic dogs. To irrigate all of these crops, vast systems of canals, dams and drainage ditches are needed. In Gujarat, checkered keelbacks wait at a culvert to catch migrating fish, but their technique isn't the most successful at first. Asia's cities are growing faster than those anywhere else in the world. Singapore has become almost totally urban in just a few decades, and the cities of Tokyo and Yokohama have combined to create a megalopolis. In Taipei, a Formosan giant flying squirrel has made a home in a school, and comes out at night to find food. In one of Taipei's city parks, Japanese rhinoceros beetles live in large densities due to ash trees being planted closer together than they would normally grow in the wild. The male beetles fight over the females. 250 years ago, Bangkok was a large wetland, and some wetland creatures still live here - in Lumphini Park, over 300 Asian water monitors hunt fish, including Mekong giant catfish. Though some species thrive in human-made environments, most need more natural habitats. In Borneo, the human population has tripled in the last fifty years, and in the same time, its amount of forest has halved. This is a problem for proboscis monkeys, which must now cross urban areas to reach tiny patches of trees. Large numbers of common swifts nest in the Western Wall of Jerusalem, one of the holiest places in Judaism. The swifts have a different problem - they have become so reliant on nesting in old human structures such as the gaps between bricks in walls, that, with ancient structures being increasingly replaced by skyscrapers, the swifts have nowhere to nest, and their numbers are plummeting. Asia: On Location shows the filming of Raja the elephant in Sri Lanka.
6	"The Arid Heart"	Nick Green	8 December 2024	5.6
Stranded ships in the Aralkum This episode focuses on Asia's deserts and arid lands, as well as the Mongolian steppe. The episode begins in Mongolia's Gobi Desert, where, for the first time, Gobi bears are filmed. These are one of the rarest animals on earth, with less than 40 known individuals, just 10 of which are female. They scent-mark on desert poplar trees, before visiting a desert oasis. A Gobi bear cub is a symbol of hope for the subspecies. At night in the Gobi, a long-eared jerboa hunts insects, including jumping into the air to catch moths in flight. The jerboa gets all of its water from its food, and so never needs to drink. The Taklamakan Desert of northern China has been called the "Sea of Death". Further southwest lies one of the most heavily populated deserts on earth, the Thar Desert of India. In the village of Khichan, the beliefs of Jainism mean that the people welcome migrating demoiselle cranes to their village, and feed them, putting out one tonne of grain for the cranes every day. On the desert's edge, in the Gir, live the last remaining Asiatic lions. After trying and failing to hunt chital, the lions are led by crows to scavenge on a gaur carcass, chasing off an Indian leopard. Further west still lies the Lut desert of Iran - the hottest place on earth, where surface temperatures reach up to 80 degrees Celsius - and Arabia's Rub' al Khali, with its vast sand dunes. Sand from the Rub' al Khali nourishes the seas of the Persian Gulf, and on the Hawar Islands of Bahrain, Socotra cormorants raise their chicks. Gangs of juvenile cormorants, not yet able to go to sea to fish for themselves but abandoned by their parents, mug the returning adults, and cannibalise the younger chicks. On the border of Kazakhstan and Uzbekistan lies the world's newest desert, the Aralkum. Just 60 years ago, this was the Aral Sea, one of the world's largest lakes, but the river that fed it was dammed to grow cotton, and the lake eventually completely dried up. Marooned ships are a reminder of the Aralkum's past. This new desert creates enormous sandstorms, which blow across Asia and engulf the cities of China, leading to devastating consequences for the people that live there. The Eurasian steppe is one habitat that is under pressure from expanding deserts. This semi-arid grassland stretches a fifth of the way around the world, from Hungary to eastern China. In Mongolia, a female Pallas' cat hunts Brandt's voles to feed her cubs. She waves her tail to "hypnotise" the voles. Mongolian gazelles have migrated south in winter for thousands of years, but now, the Trans-Siberian Railway blocks their path. The gazelles must now pass through fences of barbed wire, and many are killed or injured. To make matters worse, feral dogs patrol the tracks, and hunt the gazelles, whose escape is blocked by the fences. Of all the animals that live on the steppe, the horses are perhaps the best adapted. 800 years ago, Genghis Khan used horses to conquer vast areas of Asia, and in Mongolia's Hustai National Park, wild horses - tahki - still live. At night, however, their foals are under threat from Mongolian wolves, but the tahki are able to drive them away. Asia: On Location shows the team searching for Gobi bears.
7	"Saving Asia"	Lucy Bailey	15 December 2024	4.9
Javan green magpies The final episode is about the people who dedicate their lives to save Asia's wildlife. In Malaysian Borneo, sun bears are rescued from the pet trade and sent to the Bornean Sun Bear Conservation Centre, before eventually being released back into the wild. In Java, the demand for songbirds is so great that the forests are falling silent. One man however, is trying to rectify this, by setting up a breeding centre for the Javan green magpie, one of the world's rarest birds, and by educating local people to show that tourism through birding is preferable as it does not have as great an impact on the birds. In a lab in Okinawa, Japan, unborn slendertail lanternshark pups are rescued from their dead mothers and raised in artificial uteri. In Muncar, Java, bycatch is a big problem, especially for Mobula rays. Green lights that warn the rays of fishing nets but are invisible to target fish species have now been developed to combat this issue. In Hong Kong, facial recognition software has been developed to track the illegal trade in napoleon wrasse. Nepal is a crossroads of wildlife trafficking from India into China. At the Nepalese-Indian border, police are taught how to recognise wildlife products, and, in Kathmandu, an undercover raid is carried out, eventually seizing six kilograms of Indian pangolin scales, and arresting a man. Unfortunately, this means that the family now have no income, and the featured conservationist says that, to truly stop wildlife trafficking, the international organised crime groups should be targeted, rather than arresting poor families. In Singapore, Sunda pangolins face a different problem - urbanisation and loss of habitat. A wildlife rescue organisation rescues two pangolins from the city in the space of just a few hours. In northern Sumatra, the Batang Toru cloud forest is home to the only known population of Tapanuli orangutans in the world, but they are under threat from logging. A conservation health clinic has been set up nearby, where patients use saplings to help to pay for their healthcare, and these saplings are then planted and used in reforestation projects in the area. In neighbouring Borneo, one of these clinics has been operating since 2007, and the forest is already beginning to recover, with species such as the southern pig-tailed macaque having already returned.

== Filming firsts ==
A number of firsts were achieved by this series; behaviours, spectacles and phenomena that had never been filmed or even documented before. Some of these include:

- Moorish idols chased by grey reef sharks
- Whirlpools, Komodo National Park
- Dusky sharks living by a power station
- Swifts preyed on by fish, Tham Lod Cave
- Tibetan foxes using domestic yaks as cover to hunt
- A mother Baikal seal blowing bubbles to allow her pup to breathe underwater
- Tibetan wolf hunting chiru
- Ussuri tube-nosed bat hibernation and emergence
- Two pairs of Bengal tigers mating within just 100 metres of each other
- Persian leopard female and cubs in Iraqi Kurdistan
- Checkered keelbacks hunting fish by a culvert
- Gobi bears
- Cannibalism in Socotran cormorants
- Mongolian wolves hunting tahki

== Production ==
=== Music ===
The original score for Asia was composed by Jacob Shea and Laurentia Editha of Bleeding Fingers Music, a composer collective co-founded by Hans Zimmer. The score accompanies the seven-part natural history series and reflects the diverse environments and wildlife featured across the continent. The soundtrack album was released by Silva Screen Records in December 2024.

For the series’ global trailer, Bleeding Fingers Music collaborated with South Korean group SEVENTEEN on an original track. The track was co-composed by SEVENTEEN member Woozi and producers from Prismfilter (Prismfilter Music Group), in collaboration with Shea and Editha, and features vocals by members DK and Seungkwan.

== Reception ==
Rebecca Nicholson in The Guardian described Asia as "a televisual wonder", praising the filming, editing, soundtrack and narration, but noted the script "toned down the rhetoric that permeated Planet Earth III". Jasper Rees of The Telegraph similarly noted there are "no climate change sermons", and approved of the series' focus on visuals. Nick Duerden, writing in i, complained that Asia's format is unoriginal, but still appreciated the "familiar spell" of an Attenborough nature documentary.
