= Baru (disambiguation) =

Baru is an extinct genus of crocodile (subfamily Mekosuchinae) that emerged in Australia during the Upper Oligocene.

Baru may also refer to:

== Places ==
- Baru, Sichuan, a town in Xichang, Sichuan, China
- Baru, Iran, a village in Tehran Province, Iran
- Baru, Hunedoara, a commune in Hunedoara County, Romania
- Baroo, a town in the Punjab province of Pakistan
- Baru, Rajasthan, a small village in Rajasthan, India
- Barú District, Pérez Zeledón, a district in Costa Rica
- Karang Baru, a town in Sumatra, Indonesia
- Isla Barú, an island in Colombia
- Volcán Barú, a volcano in Panama

== Other uses ==
- Bārû, a priestly class in ancient Mesopotamia
- Baru seed, an edible legume seed native to South America, Dipteryx alata
- Baru tree, a primitive legume tree from the early branch Dipterygeae, Dipteryx alata
- Triodia wiseana (Yinjibarndi and Ngarluma: Baru), a bunchgrass species in the genus Triodia
- Baru Cormorant, the protagonist of the novel The Traitor Baru Cormorant
- Baru (Hervé Barulea; born 1947), French comics author
