= Malar, Rajasthan =

Malar Malhar
- village
- Location in Rajasthan, India Malar (India)
- Coordinates: 27°12′11″N 72°22′58″E
- Country: India
- State: Rajasthan
- District: Jodhpur
- Tehsil: Bap
- Time zone: UTC+5:30 (IST)
- ISO 3166 code: RJ-IN
- Vehicle registration: RJ-
- Climate: Dry (Köppen: BSh)
- Temperature: Summer: 45°C (122°F); Winter: -3°C (27°F)
- Lok Sabha constituency: Jodhpur

Malar is a panchayat village in the state of Rajasthan, India. Administratively, it is under Bap tehsil of Jodhpur District of Rajasthan.

There are three villages in the Malar gram panchayat: Malar, Godarli, and Reen. Places to visit "Ram Nada, Nilkanth Mahadev Mandir, Nathu Talai, Gulaab Talai, Malar Magara, Malar Rin

== Geography ==
Malar is in the Thar Desert and suffers extreme heat in the summers. It is located 10 kilometres (6 mi) north of the town of Phalodi.

Godarli is located just 2 km by dirt road to the southeast. Reen is located about 9 km by road north of Malar almost to the Agar Ka Rin (dry lake).

== History ==
Malar sits at the center of the area formerly covered by the princely states of Jaisalmer, Bikaner and Jodhpur. Until 2009, Malar was part of Phalodi tehsil, at that point Bap Taluka was created out of northern Phalodi tehsil.

== Demographics ==
In the India census of 2001, the village of Malar had a population of 943. Males constituted 501 (53.1%) of the population and females 442 (46.9%), for a gender ratio of 882 females per thousand males.
