= Bhadlachuhron Ki Basti =

Bhadlachuhron Ki Basti village is located in Phalodi Tehsil of Jodhpur district in Rajasthan, India. It is situated 78 km away from sub-district headquarter Phalodi and 213 km away from district headquarter Jodhpur.

The total geographical area of village is 12668 hectares. Bhadlachuhron Ki Basti has a total population of 1,610 people. There are about 281 houses in Bhadlachuhron Ki Basti village. Phalodi is nearest town to Bhadlachuhron Ki Basti which is approximately 78 km away.
