= Tepu =

Tepu may refer to:

- Tepu, Rajasthan, India
- Țepu, Romania
- Pelelu Tepu, a village in Suriname
- Tepú or Metrosideros stipularis, a species of the myrtle family
