= Kushlawa =

- Village
- Location in Rajasthan, India
- Coordinates: 26.7634°N 72.3962°E
- Country: India
- State: Rajasthan
- District: Jodhpur
- Tehsil: Phalodi tehsil

Population (2011)
  - Total: 787
- Time zone: UTC+5:30 (IST)
- PIN: 342309

Kushlawa is a village in the Jodhpur district of the Indian state of Rajasthan. This village comes under Phalodi tehsil. According to the 2011 Census, the village population is 787.
