= Dune Free Tract of Thar Desert =

Areas in the Thar Desert, Rajasthan, India

The Dune Free Tract, also known as the Balu Mukt Maidan, refers to specific areas in the Thar Desert, Rajasthan, India, that are characterized by the absence of dunes.

== Overview ==
The Dune Free Tract spans across several districts including Bikaner, Jaisalmer, Phalodi, and Pokhran, covering an area of approximately 65 square kilometers. Notably, this region is distinguished by its rocky terrain with exposures of limestone and sandstone rocks belonging to the Jurassic and Eocene formations. Additionally, within a radius of 64 kilometers from Jaisalmer town, small hills are present, and the dry beds and banks in the area serve as accessible sources for groundwater.

== Geology ==
The geological composition of the Dune Free Tract encompasses a variety of rock formations. Apart from limestone and sandstone, exposures of gneiss, grid conglomerate, schist, and granite rocks have been observed in certain locations within this area.
