= Splendid lanternshark =

Conservation status
- Least Concern (IUCN 3.1)

Scientific classification
- Kingdom: Animalia
- Phylum: Chordata
- Class: Chondrichthyes
- Subclass: Elasmobranchii
- Division: Selachii
- Order: Squaliformes
- Family: Etmopteridae
- Genus: Etmopterus
- Species: E. splendidus

Binomial name
- Etmopterus splendidus Ka. Yano, 1988
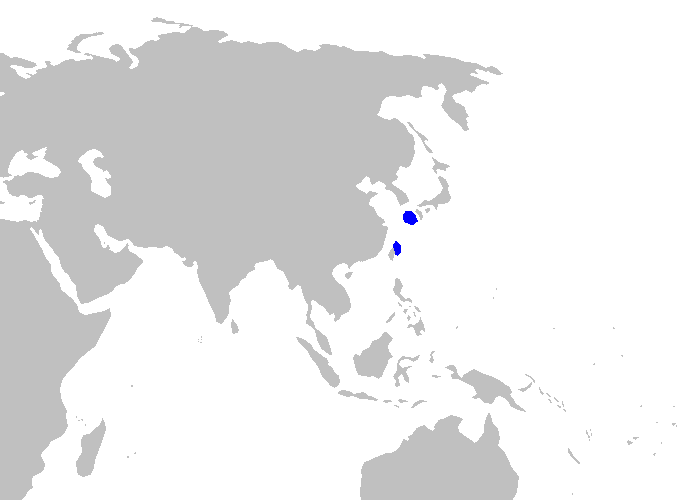
- Range of the splendid lanternshark (in blue)

Species of shark

The splendid lanternshark (Etmopterus splendidus) is a shark of the family Etmopteridae found in the western Pacific at depths between 120 and 210 m. Through the classification of Etmopterus species into several clades based on the positioning of their bioluminescent photophores, the splendid lanternshark can be considered a member of the Etmopterus pusillus clade.

Its length is up to 30 cm.

Reproduction is ovoviviparous.

== Physiological features and adaptations ==
=== Bioluminescence ===
==== Patterning ====
The patterns of bioluminescent photophores found on the rostrum, dorsal area, and around the spine of splendid lantern sharks are similar to those of other members of the family Etmopteridae, namely Etmopterus spinax and Etmopterus molleri, but there are important differences. Dorsal photophores in all three species are arranged in three lines running the length of the back, but what distinguishes the splendid lanternshark from the other species is the longitudinal line of the dorsal area. This line is different from other species' in that it is significantly thicker. The bioluminescence spectra wavelength of Etmopterus splendidus is 476 nm, which is the wavelength light is present in the depths they are normally found. This is significant as it allows their bioluminescence to hide the sharks from predators and prey.

The photophores of Etmopterus splendidus are typical of etmopterid sharks, "i.e. a cluster of photocytes enclosed in a pigmented sheath and surmounted by pigmented and lens cells" (Claes, et al.). Photophores are about 100 μm in diameter.

Splendid lanternsharks are considered to have nine distinct luminous zones: Rostral, Ventral, Lower caudal, Upper caudal, Infracaudal, Mandibular, Pectoral, Pelvic, Latera, and Infrapelvic.

Of these zones, the ventral zone is, on average, the largest zone, covering almost 90% of the organism's ventral area. In the ventral zone, the photophores are distributed with increasing density towards the midline, a pattern that matches the way surface light is seen from below.

==== Mechanism ====
There is some debate about the exact mechanism of Etmopterus splendidus' bioluminescence, although it is agreed that Etmopterus species utilize intrinsic and not symbiotic bioluminescence. The debate centers around the presence of a lucerfin system that uses coelenterazine and coelenterazine-dependent luciferase in the photophores of Etmopterus species. Some papers have found none of these compounds to be present while others have. Defense of the usage of this form of bioluminescence stems from the detection of these compounds in samples of Etmopterus species' skin as well as the hypothesized feeding of Etmopterus species on luminous copepods and comb jellies that contain coelenterazine, a manner of obtaining coelenterazine found in other bioluminescent species. Continued detection of coelenterazine and the related luciferase are needed to confirm the mechanism used, and evidence of Etmopterus eating these species.

Bioluminescence in splendid lanternsharks is controlled by both hormonal and neurological means. Melatonin (MT) and prolactin (PRL) have been found to be light-inducing hormones; α-melanocyte stimulating hormone has been found to be a light-inhibiting hormone; and GABA has been found to be a light-inhibiting neurotransmitter.

While many species alter the intensity of the light they produce in order to mimick the changes of surface light intensity, splendid lanternsharks - like other bioluminescent sharks - produce a constant light but change their depth to adjust how potential predators below them see the light.

==== Behavioral ====
Skin photophores surrounding the defensive dorsal spines present on E. splendidus show a pattern supporting an aposematic function for the bioluminescence of this species. Aposematism is the use of warning coloration to inform potential predators that an animal is poisonous or venomous. Despite the absence of poison or venom in E. splendidus, aposematic mimicry is believed to be used in its bioluminescence surrounding these defensive dorsal spines. This mechanism was documented for the first time in situ by video recordings in 2016.

E. splendidus has a translucent area present in its upper eye orbit which plays a part in a reference system for counterillumination adjustments. This unique feature also acts as a spectral filter for camouflage breaking. Rental specializations amongst these sharks aid in prey detection and help reflect lifestyle differences between very similar species of deep sea sharks such as Etmopterus spinax and Etmopterus molleri. These bioluminescent sharks possess higher rod densities, which might provide them with improved temporal resolution - particularly useful for bioluminescent communication during social interactions.

Luminous Etmopterus sharks swim faster than other deep sea species. Different swimming speeds and tail beat frequencies have been observed amongst these deep sea species via high definition digital imaging coupled with large fish traps deployed simultaneously to these video systems. Also, using these same cameras and traps, length values were measured using a special software - MatLab - between 2009 and 2012. Little to no observed size change was recorded with depth.
