= Bhojakor =

- village
- Location in Rajasthan Bhojakor (India)
- Coordinates: 26.854111°N 72.392478°E
- Country: India

Languages
- Time zone: UTC+5:30 (IST)

Bhojakor is a village Panchayat in Lohawat tehsil of Jodhpur district in Rajasthan state of India. It has a Government Secondary School. It is 6 km from Peelwa and 35 km from Phalodi, 28 km from Lohawat and 125 km from Jodhpur.

It has desert and sand dunes. Water sources include the ponds known as Rohlai Nadi, Jaitar Nadi and Indolai Nadi. There are government tube wells for drinking water which is supplied through taps to some houses. It has one morning bus to Jodhpur and the same returns from Jodhpur in the evening. Also other 3-4 buses to Phalodi (Gramin Parivahan Seva RSRTC ) and Lohawat pass through and stop here. Dechu also plenty of Buses passes thru here. It has Good Road network by PMGSY still more Roads are required for full connectivity of interior areas.

There are several Govt. Schools such as Govt. Senior Secondary School, Bhojakor, Govt. Upper Primary School, Bhojakor Kuaa, Govt. School, Ramdev Nagar. and one non-government school which is Shri Adarsh Secondary School, Bhojakor.
