= Khichan =

Khichan Kheechan
- village
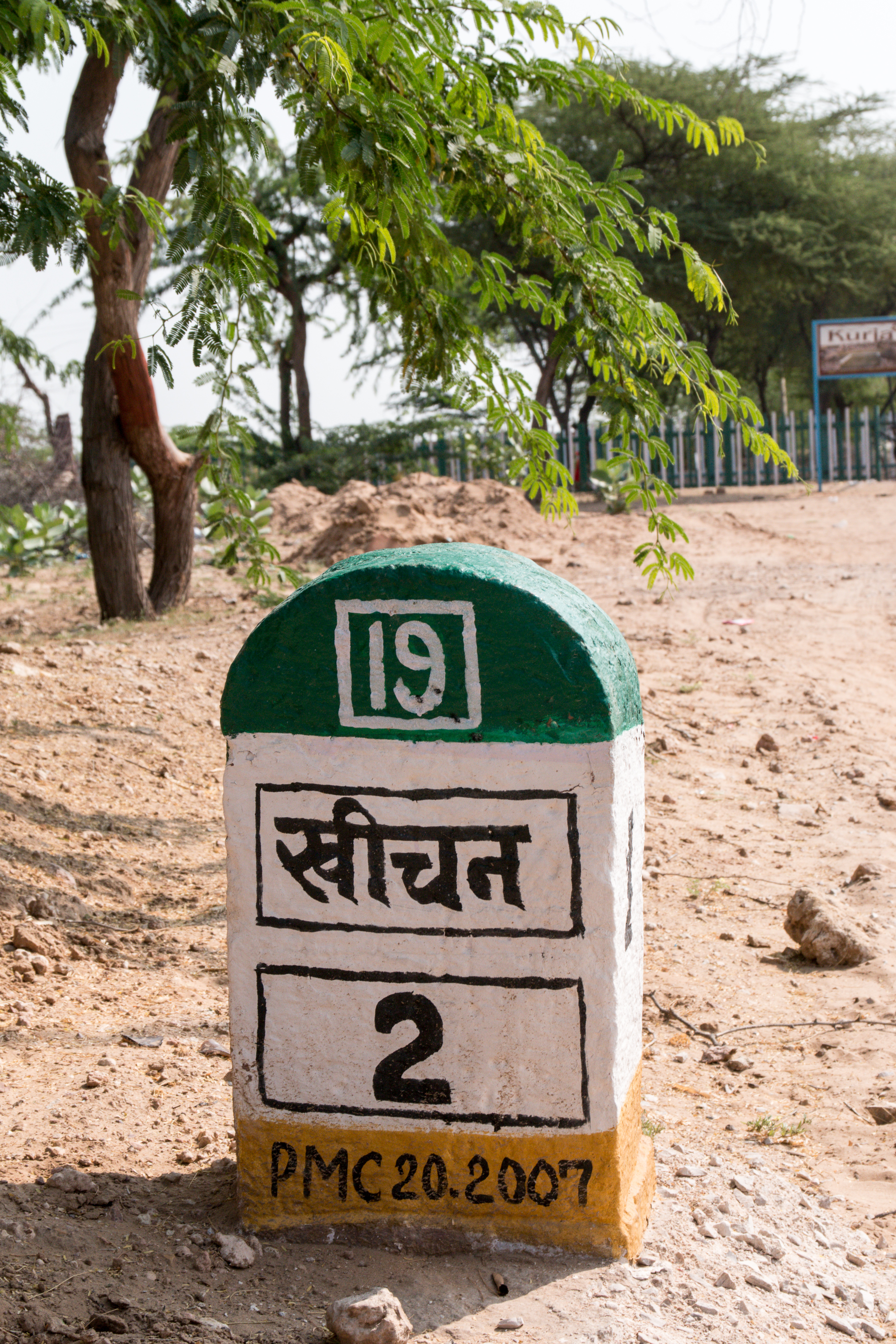
- Milestone at level crossing of Khichan

- Location in Rajasthan, India Khichan (India)
- Coordinates: 27.135°N 72.415°E
- Country: India
- State: Rajasthan
- District: Phalodi
- Tehsil: Phalodi

Government
  - Body: Panchayat
- Elevation: 219 m (719 ft)

Population (2011)
  - Total: 7,025

Languages
  - Official: Marwari
- Time zone: UTC+5:30 (IST)
- ISO 3166 code: RJ-IN

Khichan village, and the eponymous adjacent Khichan Ramsar site wetland, are in the Phalodi tehsil of Phalodi district of Rajasthan state of India. The Khichan wetland, a Ramsar site, is known for a large number of migratory demoiselle cranes that visit it every winter.

== History ==
Khichan was one of the main jagir of Akherajot Rajpurohits during the Rathore dynasty. Sthanakvasi Jain monks Prakashchand (leader of Gyan Gutch sampradaya) and Uttamchandji (leader of Samrath Gutch sampradaya) were born in this village.

== Demographics ==
According to the 2011 census of India, the population of the village is 7025, including 3729 males and 3296 females. The village is home to 1190 families.

The village has a number of Marwari Jain and Akherajot Rajpurohit families.

== Transport ==
Khichan, a desert village, is 3.4 km west of the centre of Phalodi town and 150 km northwest of Jodhpur city.

=== Airport ===
Jodhpur Airport, the nearest airport, is 139 km southeast of Khichan by road.

=== Railway ===
Phalodi Junction railway station on the broad gauge line connects all important towns in Rajasthan, including the Delhi-Jaisalmer-Bikaner-Jaisalmer route which has three trains running from Jodhpur (southwest) and three from Jaisalmer (west). A direct train also runs from Delhi.

=== Road ===
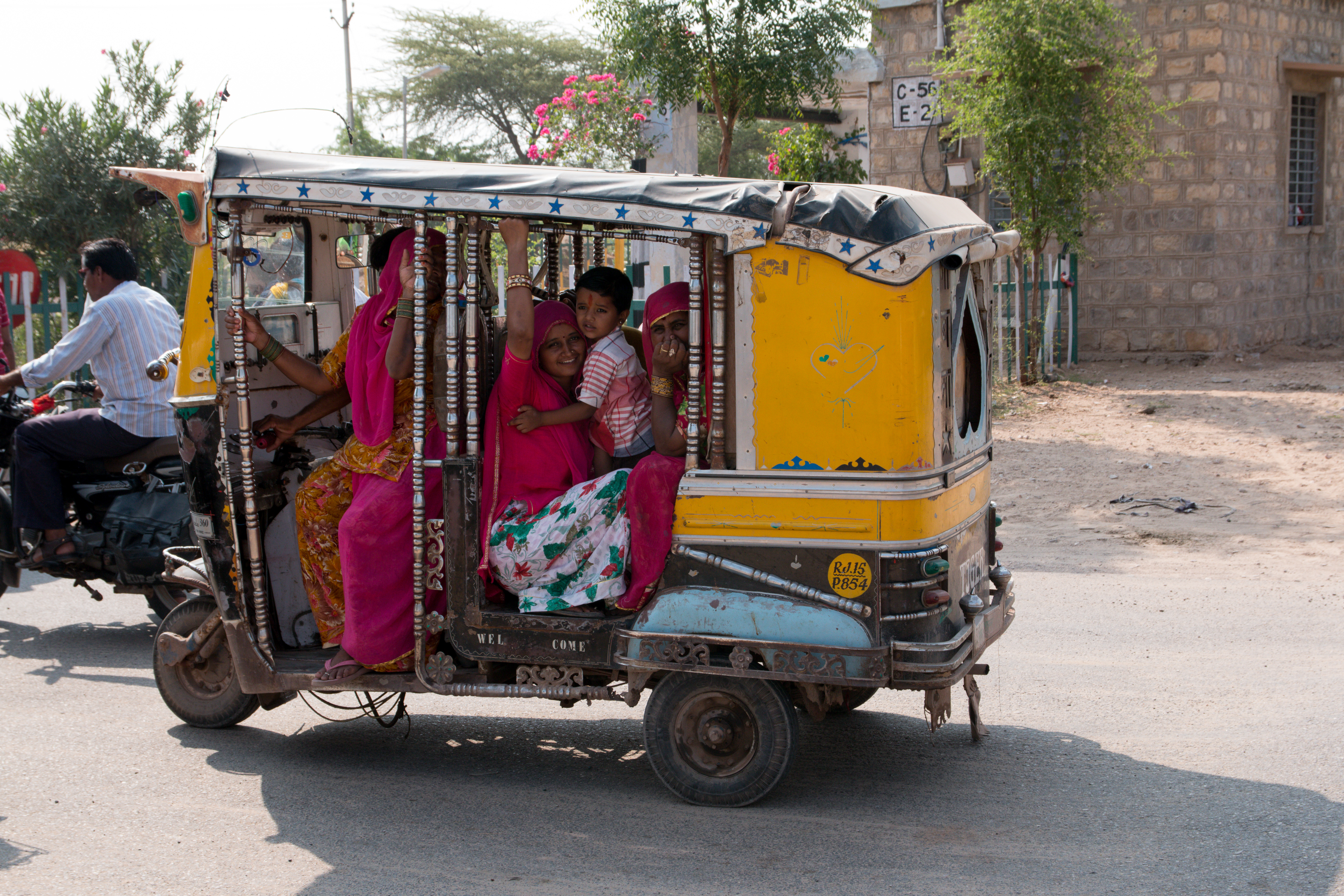
An autorickshaw.

Bikaner (156 km northeast), Nagaur (145 km east) and Jaisalmer (165 km in west) are also connected to the village. The Pakistan Border is about 100 km north. NH-15 skirts towards Phalodi.

== Ramsar site ==
The annual migration of Demoiselle cranes began with around a hundred cranes in the 1970s, when a local couple started feeding pigeons. Other villagers joined their efforts, and as of 2014, Khichan now hosts over 30,000 demoiselle cranes from as early as August each year to as late as March of the following year.

=== Kurja Conservation Reserve ===
The Kurja Conservation Reserve at Khichan in Rajasthan was officially notified by the Rajasthan Forest Department on April 26, 2023, under notification number F.3(10)Van/2022. Recognized as India's first conservation reserve dedicated to the Demoiselle crane (Anthropoides virgo), locally known as Kurja, the reserve covers an area of approximately 2.92 square kilometers in the Phalodi district. It serves as a protected habitat for thousands of migratory cranes that visit annually from Central Asia.

=== Flora ===
Regarding the flora, the Ramsar site designation for Khichan reads as, "The Site, located in the northern Thar Desert, comprises two water bodies, Ratri nadi (river) and Vijaysagar talab (pond), riparian habitat and scrub land. This desert ecosystem supports drought-resistant plant species..."

=== Fauna ===
Regarding the fauns, the Ramsar site designation for Khichan reads as, "The Site, ... supports drought-resistant plant species that provide habitat for over 150 species of birds. The Site is especially recognized for hosting large wintering flocks of migratory demoiselle cranes (Anthropoides virgo), making up over 22,000 individuals each year."

==== Demoiselle cranes ====
In the 1970s, Ratanlal Maloo, a native of Khichan who had been working in Odisha, returned to the village. Since he did not have a lot of work, his uncle gave him the job of feeding pigeons. Being devout Jain, Ratanlal and his wife accepted the task. Ratanlal would carry grain sacks to the feeding place, and his wife would help him spread the grains on the ground. A number of pigeons, sparrows and squirrels started coming to the place; peacocks also occasionally visited the place. In September, a dozen demoiselle cranes (called kurja in Rajasthani) also joined the other birds. These birds had been seen visiting the farmlands of Kheechan earlier. During September–February, around 100 cranes came to the feeding place. During the next winter, around 150 cranes visited the place. As the cranes grew in numbers, the local dogs started hunting them. So, Ratan Lal asked the village panchayat to allot him some land on the outskirts of the village. Some of the villagers joined him in building a chugga ghar ("bird feeding home"), with a granary and a fence. Several Jain traders supported the initiative by supplying grains. What started initially as a few dozen visiting birds has now become a major migration with thousands of cranes visiting the village year after year, during the period of August to March, and the number is reported to be increasing. This is attributed to the organised and natural feeding done by the village community, twice a day during the birds entire sojourn to the town in the months of August to March, with November to February being the peak season.

In 2008, it was estimated that up to 3,000 kilograms (6,600 lb) of bird seed are consumed every day by the feeding birds. In 2010, the number of cranes visiting Kheechan was estimated at 15,000. The village achieved international recognition when it was featured in Birding World magazine in an article titled, "Khichan - the Demoiselle Crane village". It has now become popular among bird watchers.

==== Daily routine of Khichan cranes ====
The cranes fly into specially created rectangular enclosures of 50x60m, at the edge of the village, called locally as chugga ghar's, where they have a breakfast session which lasts for about 90 minutes. They are fed in groups, one after the other. Their flights, in the setting of the conventional mansions (some of them are heritage buildings being converted to tourist lodges) of the village, present brilliant photo-ops for the large number of tourists who flock to the village for bird watching. After feeding, the cranes, in large congregations, are seen at some of the water bodies (ponds) and sand dunes to the north of Khichan. Peafowl are the other dominant birds seen around the cranes.

The cranes fly in different directions in small family flocks, in a disciplined order led by the female, followed closely by two young ones with the male forming the rear guard. Again, during mid day, they assemble for a drink, followed by an occasional bath, and a second feed. Acrobatic exhibition of mutual affection between couples is also seen. They roost in far away agriculture fields and return to the same water bodies next day, early in the morning.

==== Fauna support community ====
Currently, the daily feed of the birds is managed by Pakshi Chuggha Ghar of A. B. Khichan Jain Shree Sangh. Donations by locals and tourists support the cause. Previously, monetary donations from local people and visitors were managed by Kuraj Samrakshan Vikas Sansthan, a society established in Khichan for crane protection and care. The Marwar Crane Foundation (MCF) also supports the villagers' efforts.

== Gallery ==
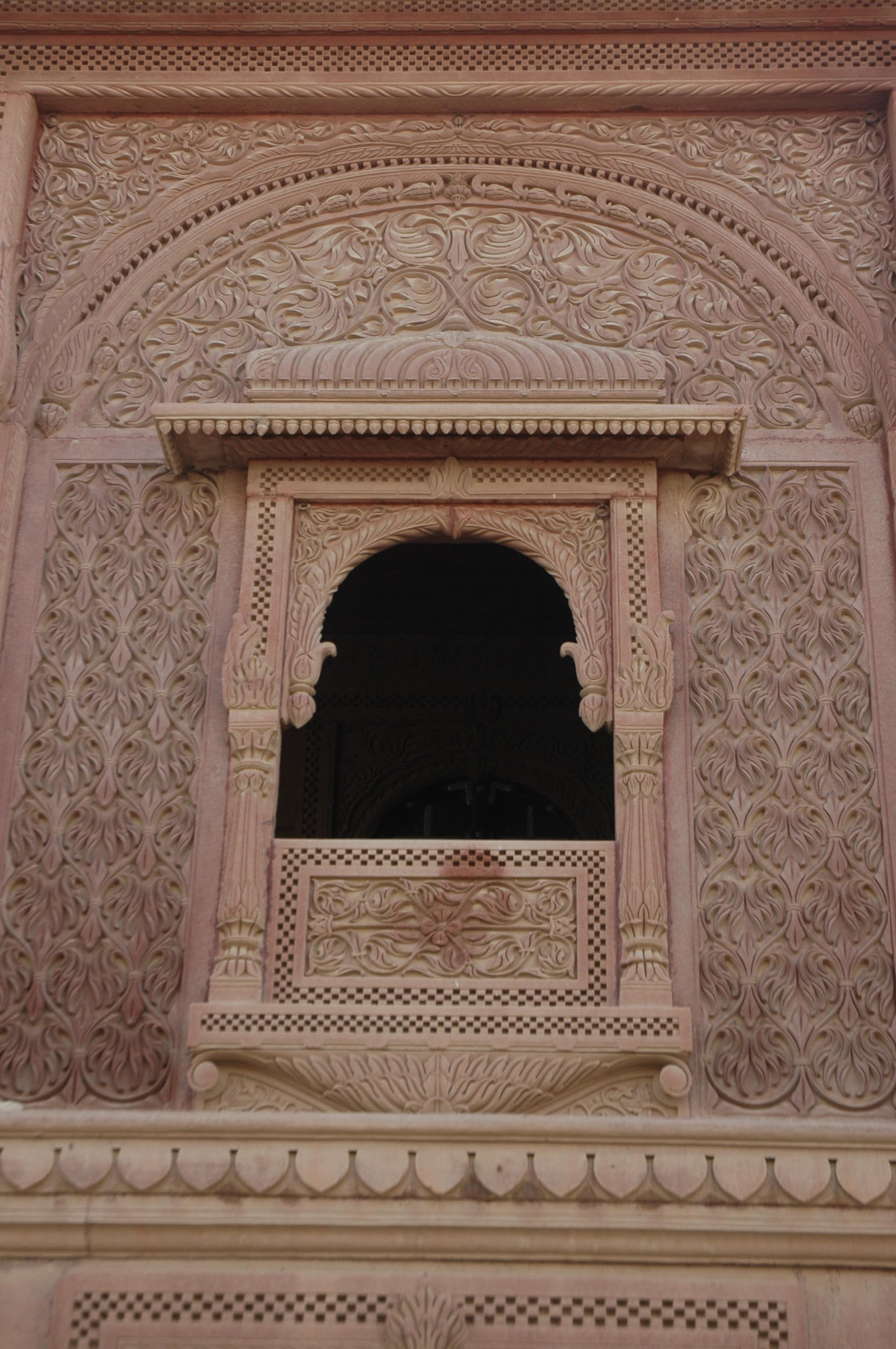
A jharokha in Khichan.

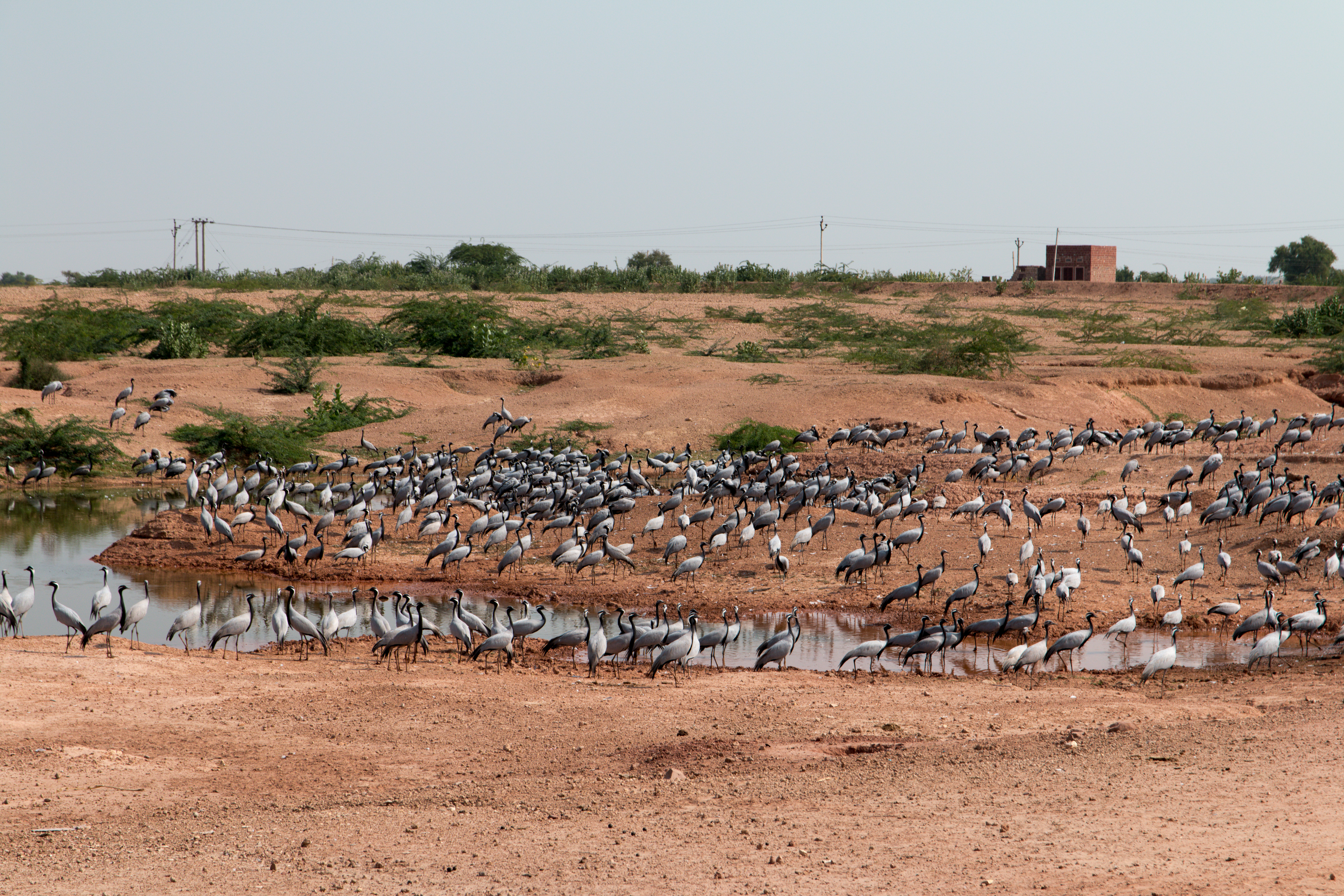
A chugga ghar (bird-feeding house) in Khichan

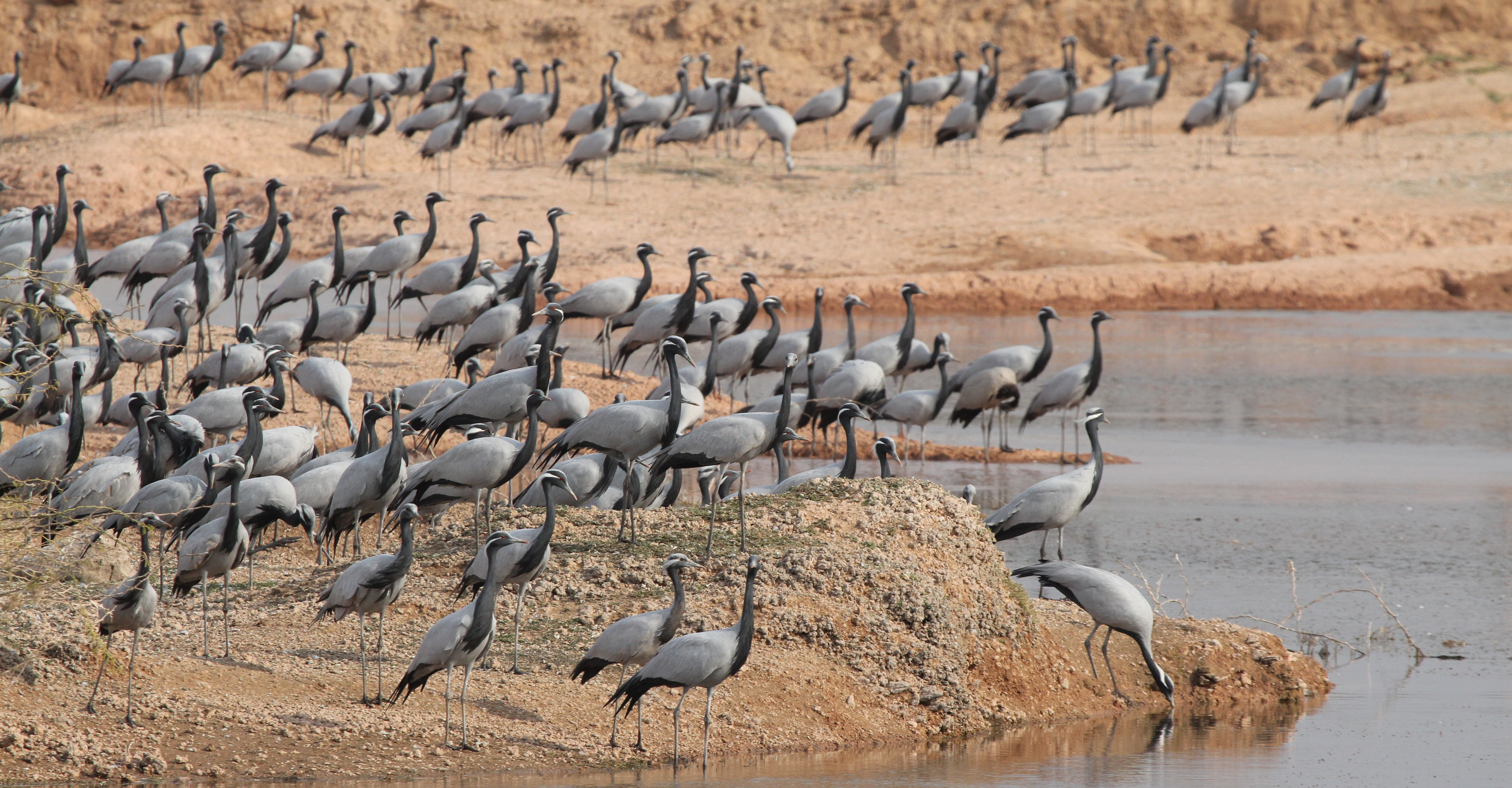
The congregation of demoiselle cranes.

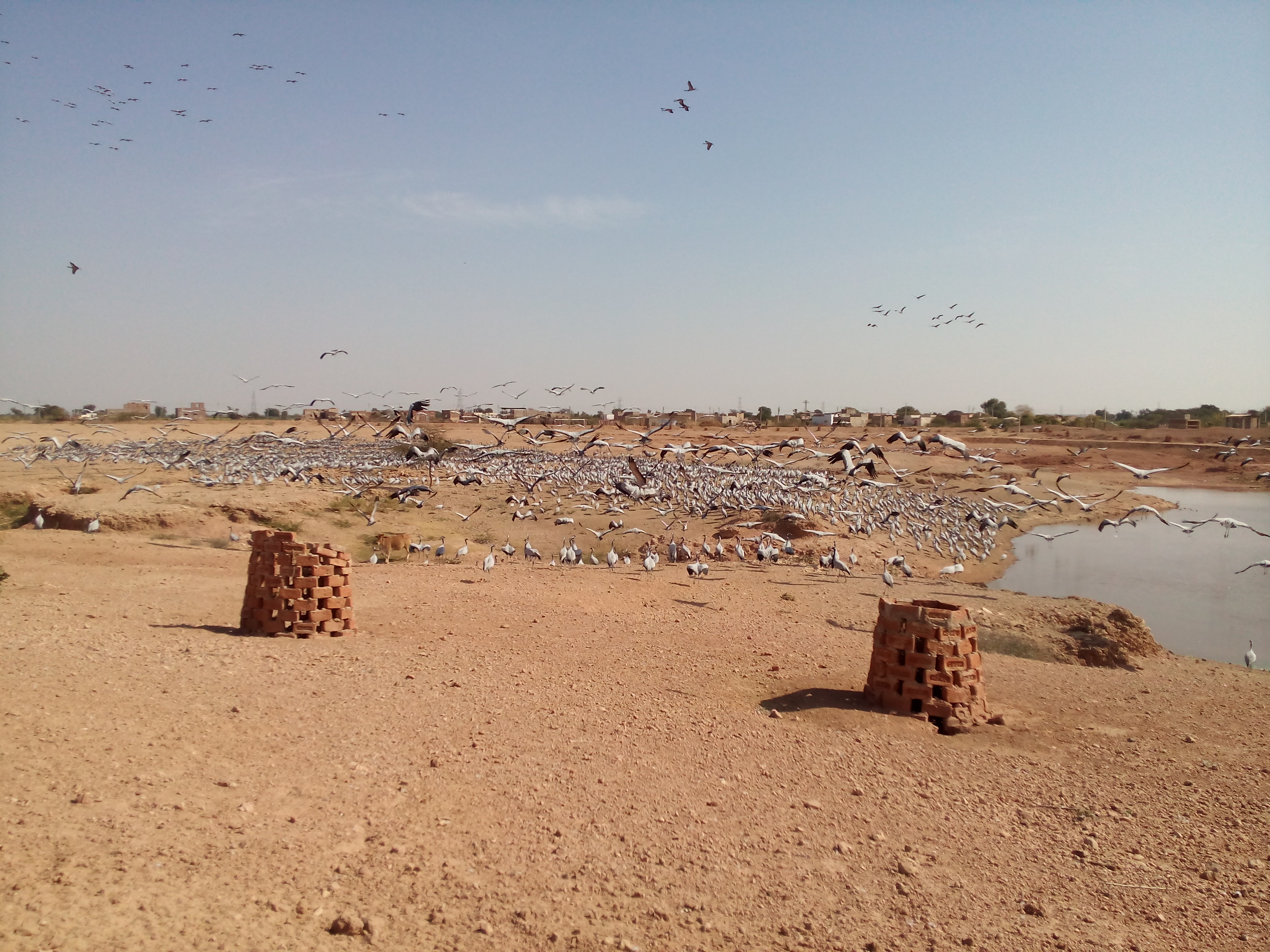
Demoiselle Cranes at Khichan

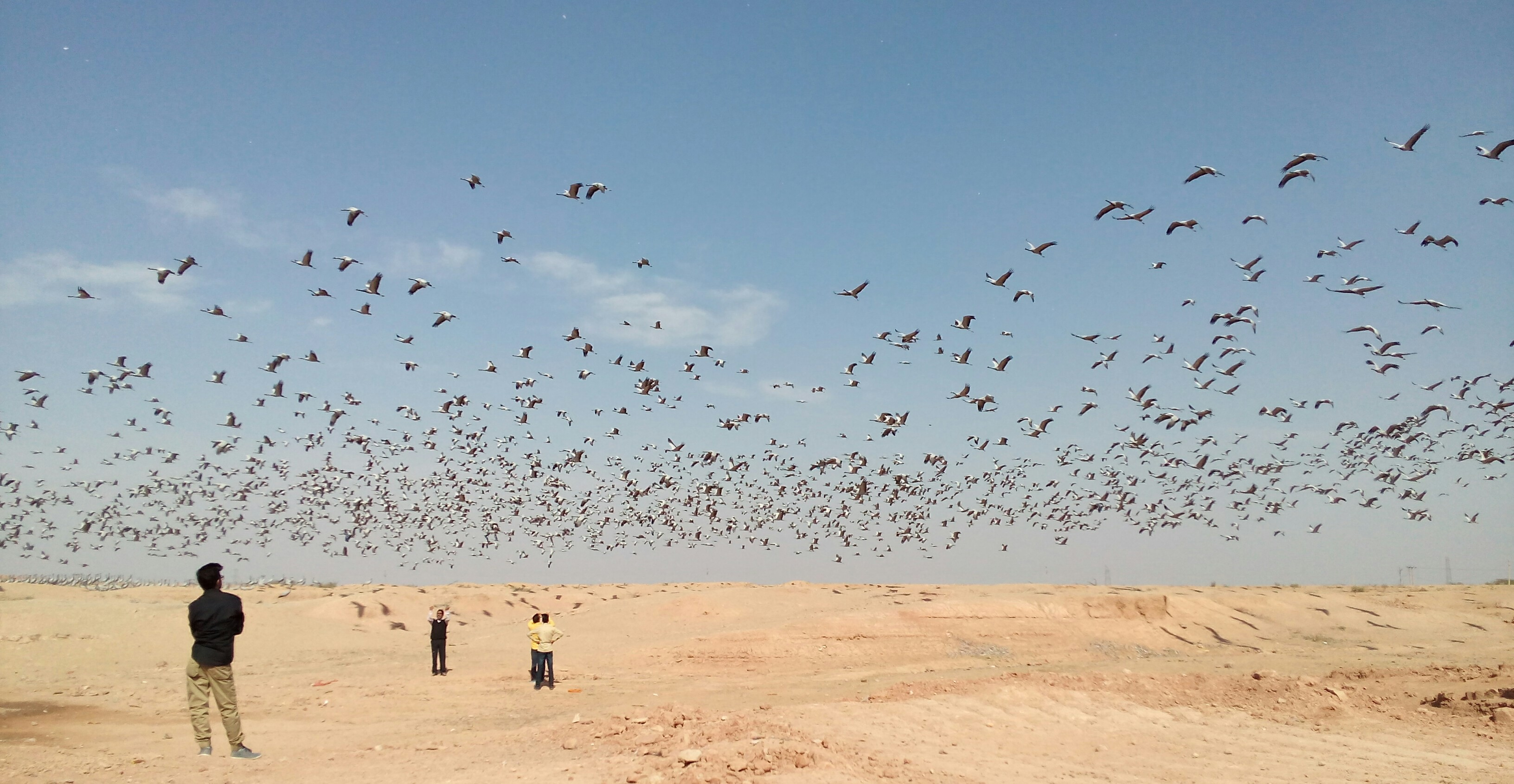
Demoiselle crane flying on the sky at Khichan.

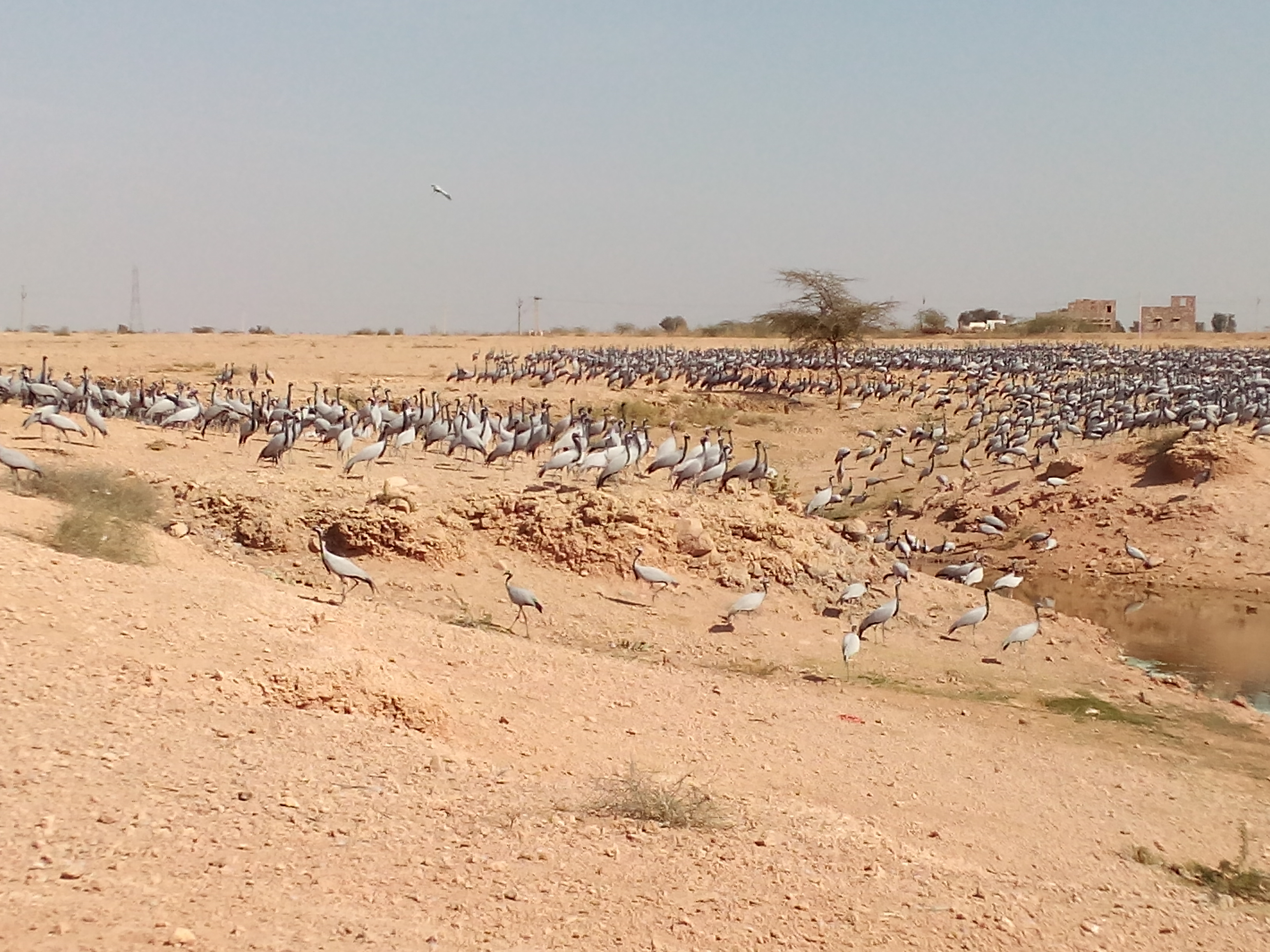
Demoiselle Cranes at Khichan.

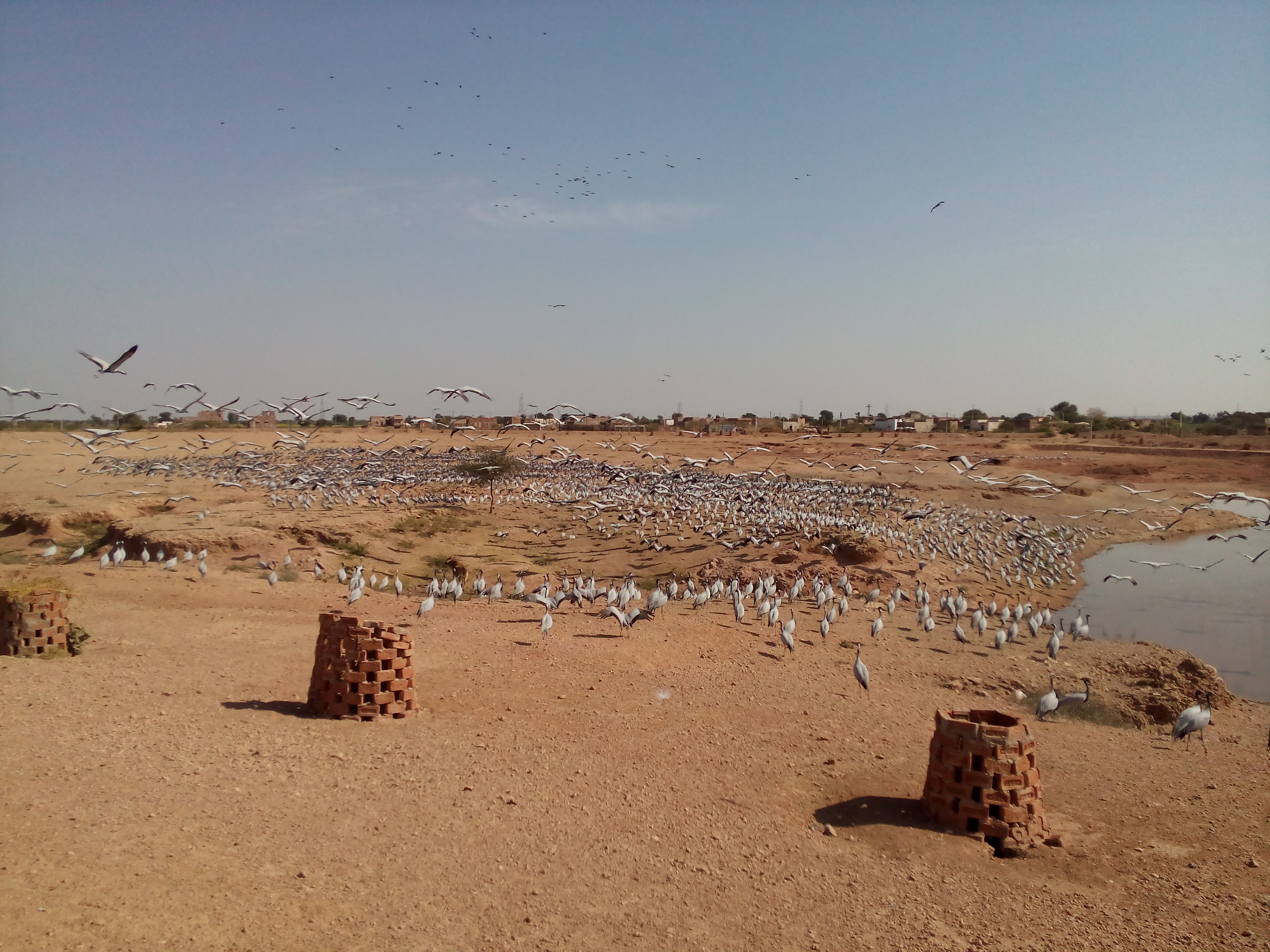
Demoiselle Cranes at Khichan.

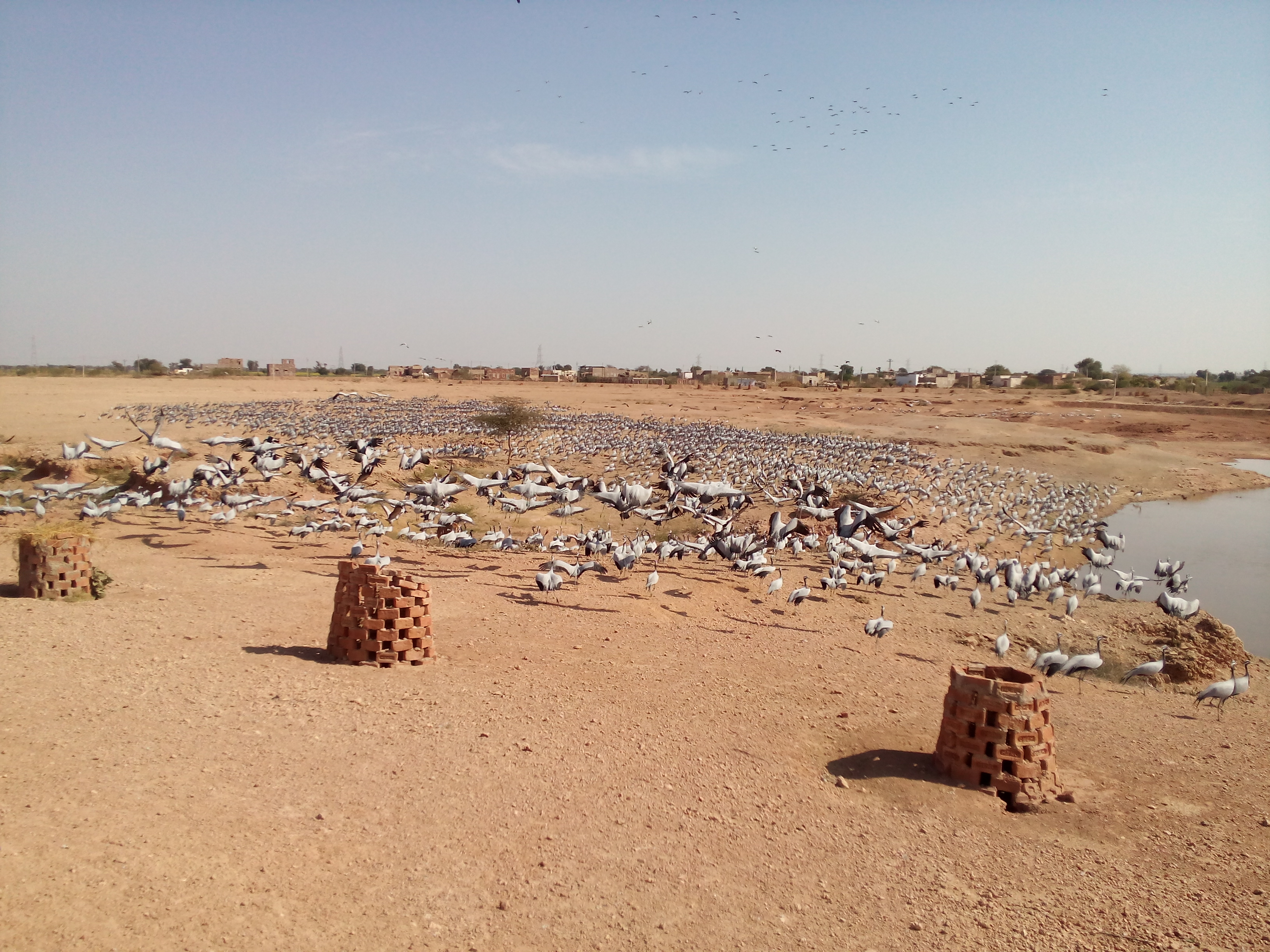
Demoiselle Cranes at Khichan.

== See also ==
- List of Ramsar sites in India
- List of national parks in India
- Protected areas of India
- Tourism in Rajasthan
