= Manewra =

Manewra (Maneora) is a small village in Phalodi tehsil, Jodhpur district, Rajasthan, India. Its population is one thousand.

Most of the people in the village are Bishnoi, subcaste Bhanwal, Suthar, subcaste Bamniya but in ten houses there are Meghwal, and in one Lohar.and twenty five houses there are Brahman.

Manewra is situated near Champasar (4 km.), Ajasar (5 km.), Kharia (4 km0, choutin/laxmannagar (11 km.) and Chadi 15 km . Its postal pin code is 342312.

In this village two hundred person are in government service. Most are in the Indian army and some are teachers. Other are farmers, but agriculture depends on the weather, as there are no facilities for irrigation water, so villagers depend on the rainy season.
