= Phalodi Solar Power Plant =

Photovoltaic power plant in Rajasthan, India

Phalodi Solar Power Plant is a 50 megawatt photo-voltaic power plant in Phalodi city of Rajasthan state in India. The plant was built and commissioned by Welspun Energy under the Jawaharlal Nehru National Solar Mission to promote ecologically sustainable growth.
