= Bap tehsil =

Coordinates: 27°22′20″N 72°20′55″E

- Tehsil
- Interactive map of Bap tehsil
- Country: India
- State: Rajasthan
- District: Jodhpur District
- Headquarters: Bap

Bap tehsil is a tehsil in Jodhpur District of Rajasthan state in western India. Headquarters for the tehsil is the village of Bap.

Bap tehsil is the northernmost of the eleven tehsils in Jodhpur District. It borders Phalodi tehsil to the south, Jaisalmer District to the west and northwest, and Bikaner District to the north and east.

== History ==
Bap Tehsil was created in Jodhpur District in 2012 out of the northern part of Phalodi Tehsil. Prior to that the area had been an independent sub-tehsil with its own local council (panchayat samiti).

In August 2023 the Bap Tehsil was reduced in size with the eastern part separated off into the new Ghantiyali Tehsil, and both were incorporated into the new Phalodi District.

== Villages ==
There are thirty-two panchayat villages in Bap tehsil.

- Badi Sid
- Bap
- Baroo
- Bawari Kallan
- Boogadi
- Chakhu
- Champasar
- Charnai
- Cheemana
- Dedasari
- Ghantiyali
- Ghator
- Jaisala
- Jambha
- Jod
- Kalyan Singh Ki Sid
- Kan Singh Ki Sid
- Kanasar
- Kelansar
- Luna
- Malar (Malhar)
- Motai
- Naneu
- Nokhara Bhatiya
- Nure Ki Bhurj
- Raneri
- Rohina
- Sanwara Gaon
- Shekhasar
- Surpura
- Tekra
- Tepu
