= Baru, Rajasthan =

Village in Rajasthan, India

Baru बरू
- Village & Gram Panchayat
- Baru
- Map showing Baru in Rajasthan
- Coordinates (Baru): 27.3624°N 71.8869°E
- Country: India
- State: Rajasthan
- District: Phalodi
- Tehsil: Bap

Population (2011)
  - Total: 3,782

Languages
  - Vernacular: Marwari
  - Official: Hindi
- PIN: 342301

Baru (also spelled as Baroo) is a prominent village and a gram panchayat located in the Bap tehsil of the newly formed Phalodi district (formerly in Jodhpur district) of the Indian state of Rajasthan.

== Geography and climate ==
While the western and southern sides of the village are covered by sand dunes characteristic of the Thar Desert, the northern side is a mix of sand dunes and flat plains, and the eastern side is mostly arable plain land.

Baru lies in an arid region. The monsoon season, starting from late July and continuing until early October, supplies the much-needed water for agriculture. The region experiences extreme climate throughout the year; temperatures dip to near 0 °C in winter (December to January) and soar up to 50 °C during the peak summer months (April to early July).

== History and development ==
Historically, due to arid conditions, villagers depended heavily on ancient deep wells, locally known as Koyar, for their daily water needs. Since water was scarce, the agricultural output was limited to a few hardy Rabi crops, primarily pearl millet (Bajra) and mustard (Raydo). The main occupation of the villagers was cattle rearing, with cows kept for dairy and goats raised for trade with visiting merchants.

During the early 2000s, the village lacked reliable electricity due to poor road connectivity to the nearest major towns. However, a significant transformation occurred around the year 2005. The state government improved road infrastructure connecting Baru and established a stable electricity supply. Subsequently, state-sponsored initiatives successfully installed tube wells (borewells), tapping into the groundwater. Although the water had high fluoride content, it sparked an agricultural revolution in the village. Government loans empowered farmers to install private borewells, shifting the primary economic driver from cattle rearing to large-scale agriculture.

The village is also culturally rich and houses various ancient temples, including the highly revered Khinwanj (or Khinwal) Mata temple and the Thakur Ji temple.

== Economy ==
Today, agriculture forms the robust foundation of Baru's economy. The widespread use of modern farming techniques and tractors has boosted local trade. The primary crops cultivated by the farmers include:

- Mustard (Raydo)
- Wheat (Gehu)
- Pearl millet (Bajra)
- Cumin (Jeera)
- Psyllium (Isabgol)
- Arugula (Taramira)
- Ricinus (Arandi/Castor)
- Groundnut (Mungfali)

In recent years, the surrounding regions of Phalodi and Bap have seen massive investments in renewable energy, particularly solar parks and wind energy, which has created indirect employment opportunities for the locals. Local businesses, such as agricultural equipment shops, seed centers, and digital service centers (like E-Mitra), further drive the village economy.

== Infrastructure and facilities ==
As a Gram Panchayat headquarters, Baru has seen considerable infrastructural growth. The village is equipped with a Government Senior Secondary School, a Community Health Centre (CHC) for primary medical care, and digital service centers connecting the rural population to government schemes.
