= Aaseji Nagar =

Village in Jodhpur district, Rajasthan, India

- Village
- Location in Rajasthan, India Aaseji Nagar (India)
- Coordinates: 27°07′27″N 72°19′40″E
- Country: India
- State: Rajasthan
- District: Jodhpur district
- Tehsil: Phalodi

Population (2011)
  - Total: 308

Languages
- Postal Index Number (PIN): 342311

Aaseji Nagar is a village located in the Phalodi tehsil of Jodhpur district, Rajasthan, India. It has a population of 308 according to the 2011 Indian National Population survey.

There are several temples and schools in the village.

Aaseji Nagar has no railway station, but there are bus services. The Postal Index Number of the village is 342311.

The village is in the Thar Desert, and the inhabitants make their living mainly by agriculture. Crops grown include millet, moong, and wheat. There are a large number of Prosopis cineraria trees. Prosopis cineraria or khejri is the state tree of Rajasthan state.
