= Phalodi tehsil =

- Tehsil
- Phalodi tehsil
- Location of Phalodi tehsil in Phalodi district
- Coordinates: 16.75°N 75.68°E
- Region: West India
- Headquarters: Phalodi

Area
  - Total: 7,697 km^{2} (2,972 sq mi)

Population (2011)
  - Total: 564,560
  - Density: 73.35/km^{2} (190.0/sq mi)

Languages
  - Official: Hindi
- Time zone: UTC+5:30 (IST)
- Vehicle registration: RJ-43
- Website: jodhpur.rajasthan.gov.in

Phalodi is a tehsil in the Phalodi District of Rajasthan state in western India. The headquarters of the tehsil is the city of Phalodi.

== Geography ==
Phalodi tehsil is the second northernmost of the eleven tehsils in Jodhpur District. It borders Bap tehsil to the north, Nagaur district to the east, Osian tehsil to the southeast and south, Balesar tehsil and Shergarh tehsil to the south; and Jaisalmer district to the west. It is situated between latitude 27°06' to 27°09' north and 72°20' to 72°23' east. It has an average elevation of 303 metres (994 feet).

== History ==
Phalodi tehsil was much larger before 2012 when the northern part was taken to create Bap tehsil, which had been an independent sub-tehsil with its own local council (panchayat samiti) under Phalodi tehsil.

== Villages ==
There are thirty-eight panchayat villages in Phalodi tehsil.

- Manewra
- Aaseji Nagar
