= Baroo =

Town and union council in Punjab province, Pakistan

Coordinates: 32°45′20″N 74°19′40″E

- Town and union council
- Interactive map of Baroo
- Country: Pakistan
- Province: Punjab
- District: Gujrat
- Time zone: UTC+5 (PST)

Baroo or Baru is a town and union council of Gujrat District, in the Punjab province of Pakistan. It is located at 32°45'20N 74°19'40E, at an altitude of 267 metres (879 feet).
