= Demoiselle crane =

- At Tal Chhapar Sanctuary, Churu, Rajasthan

Conservation status
- Least Concern (IUCN 3.1)
- CITES Appendix II

Scientific classification
- Kingdom: Animalia
- Phylum: Chordata
- Class: Aves
- Order: Gruiformes
- Family: Gruidae
- Genus: Grus
- Species: G. virgo

Binomial name
- Grus virgo (Linnaeus, 1758) [originally Ardea]
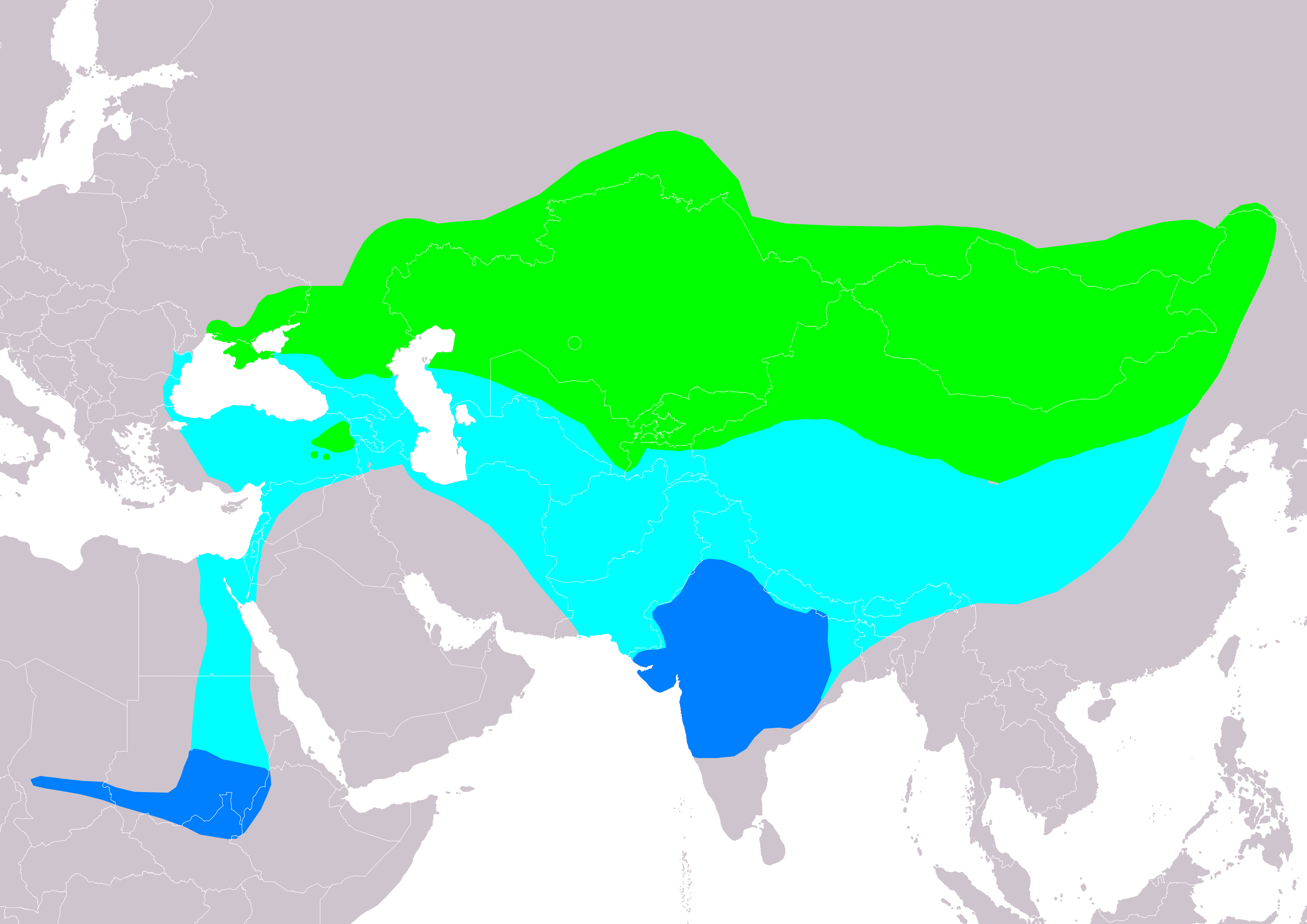
- Range of G. virgo Breeding Passage Non-breeding

Synonyms
- Anthropoides virgo (Linnaeus, 1758); Ardea virgo Linnaeus, 1758; Grus ornata Brehm, CL, 1855

Species of large migratory bird

The demoiselle crane (Grus virgo) is a species of crane found in central Eurosiberia, ranging from the Black Sea to Mongolia and Northeast China. There is also a small breeding population in Turkey. These cranes are migratory birds. Birds from western Eurasia will spend the winter in Africa while the birds from Asia, Mongolia and China will spend the winter in the Indian subcontinent. The bird is symbolically significant in the culture of India, where it is known as koonj or kurjaa.

== Taxonomy ==
The demoiselle crane was formally described in 1758 by the Swedish naturalist Carl Linnaeus in the tenth edition of his Systema Naturae. He placed it with the herons and cranes in the genus Ardea and coined the binomial name Ardea virgo. He specified the type locality as the orient but this has been restricted to India. Linnaeus cited the accounts by earlier authors. The English naturalist Eleazar Albin had described and illustrated the "Numidian crane" in 1738. Albin explained that: "This Bird is called Demoiselles by reason of certain ways of acting that it has, wherein it seems to imitate the Gestures of a Woman who affects a Grace in her Walking, Obeisances, and Dancing". Linnaeus also cited the English naturalist George Edwards who had described and illustrated the "Demoiselle of Numidia" in 1750. The name "la demoiselle de Numidie" had been used in 1676 by the French naturalist Claude Perrault. The demoiselle crane is now placed in the genus Grus that was introduced in 1760 by the French zoologist Mathurin Jacques Brisson. The species is treated as monospecific: no subspecies are recognised. The genus name Grus is the Latin word for a "crane". The specific epithet virgo is Latin meaning "maiden". Some authorities place this species together with the closely related blue crane (Grus paradisea) in the genus Anthropoides.

== Description ==
The demoiselle is 85–100 cm (33.5–39.5 in) long, 76 cm (30 in) tall and has a 155–180 cm (61–71 in) wingspan. It weighs 2–3 kg (4.4–6.6 lb). It is the smallest species of crane. The demoiselle crane is slightly smaller than the common crane but has similar plumage. It has a long white neck stripe and the black on the foreneck extends down over the chest in a plume.

It has a loud trumpeting call, higher-pitched than the common crane. Like other cranes it has a dancing display, more balletic than the common crane, with less leaping.

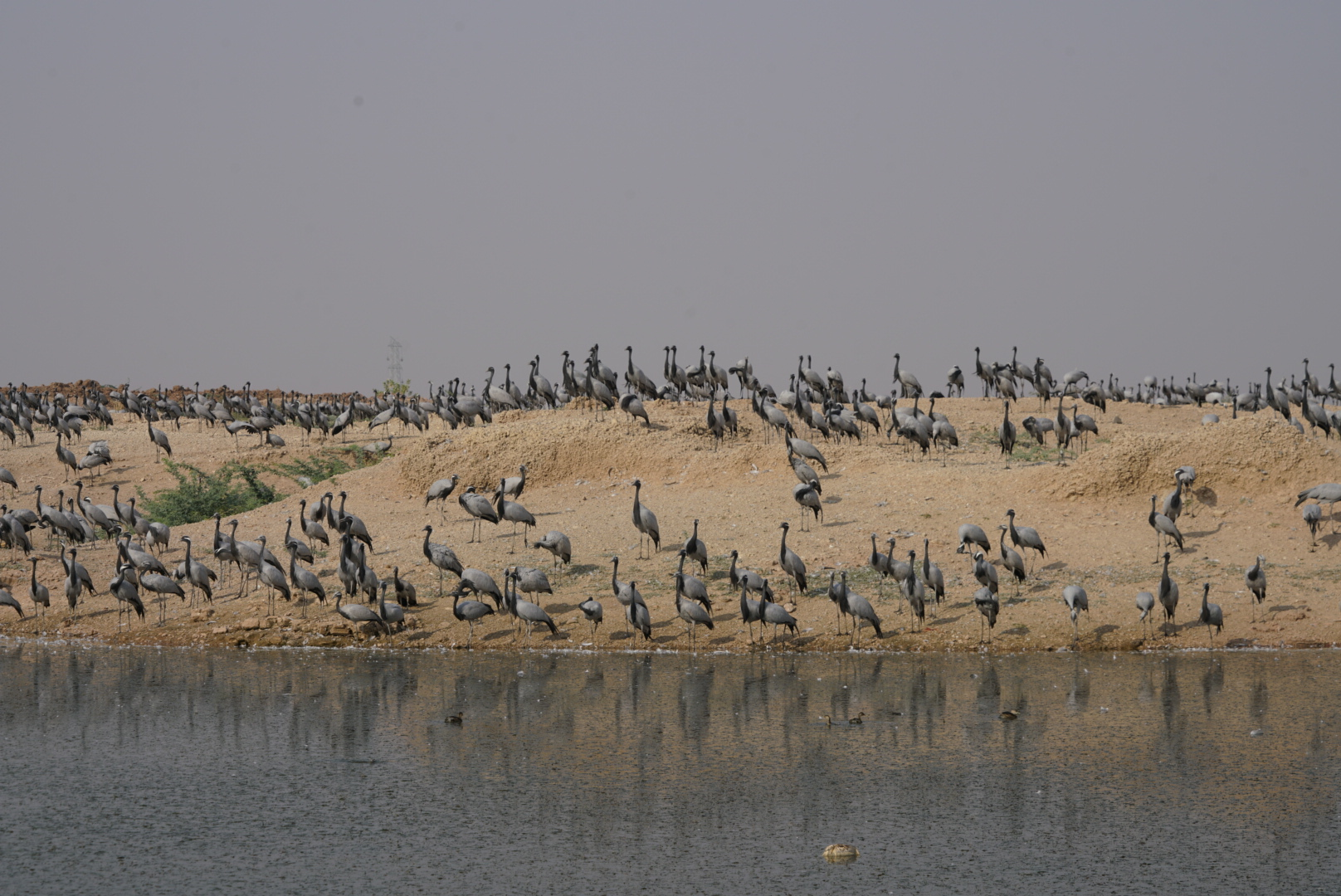
In the village of Khichan, Rajasthan India

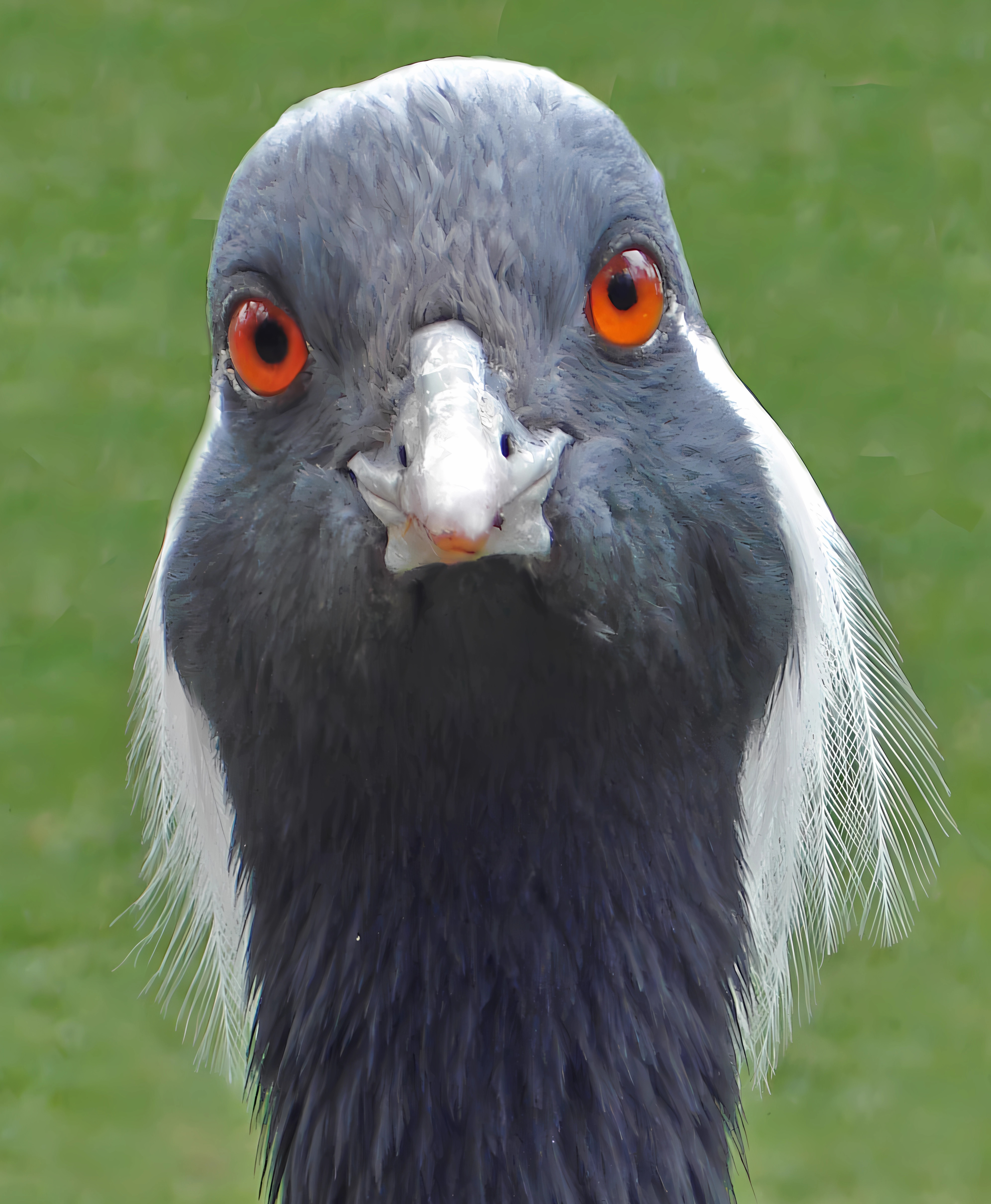
Portrait

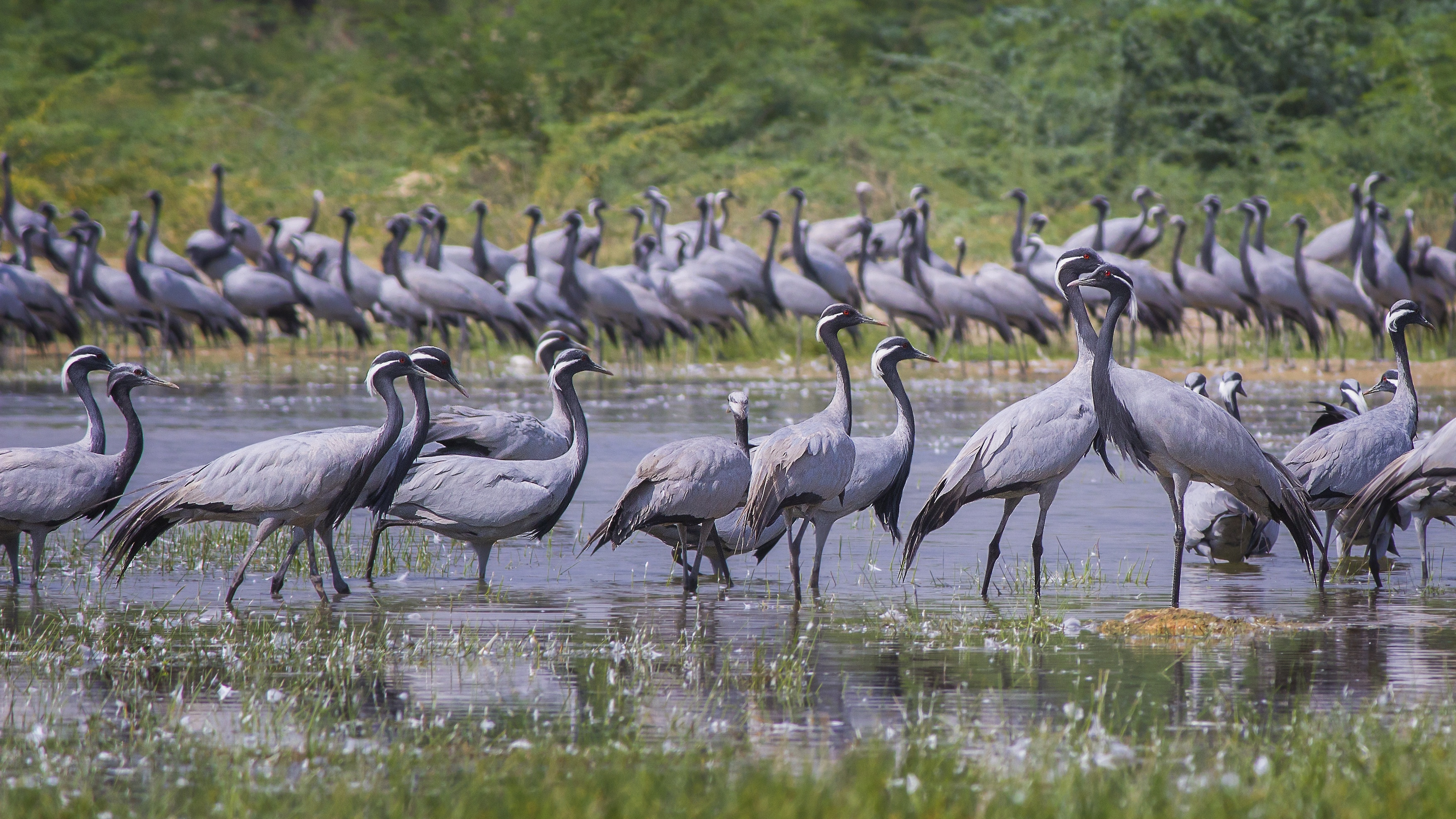
Near Jodhpur, Rajasthan, India

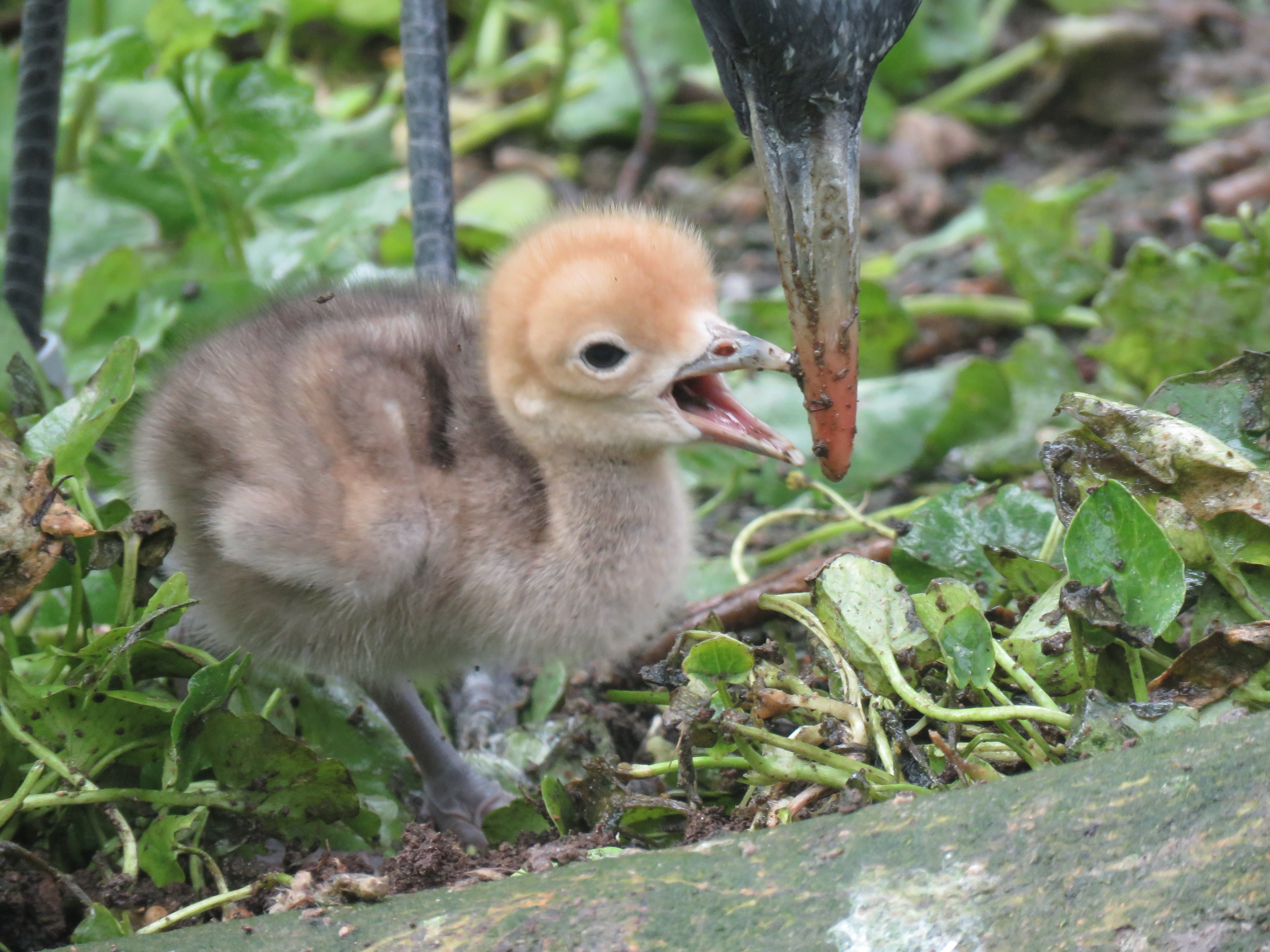
Chick with parent at Hellabrunn Zoo, Munich, Germany

== Distribution and habitat ==
The demoiselle crane breeds in central Eurasia from the Black Sea east to Mongolia and northeast China. It breeds in open habitats with sparse vegetation, usually near water. In winter it migrates either to the Sahel region of Africa, from Lake Chad eastwards to southern Ethiopia, or to western regions of the Indian subcontinent. There was previously a small population in Turkey and an isolated resident population in the Atlas Mountains of northwest Africa. These are both now extinct. On its Indian wintering grounds it forms large flocks which gather on agricultural land. It roosts at night in shallow open water.

== Behaviour and ecology ==
=== Breeding ===
Eggs are laid between April and May. The minimal nest is placed on an open patch of grass or bare ground. The clutch is normally two eggs. These are laid at daily intervals and incubation begins after the first egg. Incubation is by both sexes but mainly by the female. The eggs hatch asynchronously after 27 to 29 days. The chicks are pale brown above and greyish white below. They are fed and cared for by both parents. The fledgeling period is between 55 and 65 days. They first breed when they are two years old.

== In culture ==
The demoiselle crane is known as the koonj/kurjan in the languages of North India, and figure prominently in the literature, poetry and idiom of the region. Beautiful women are often compared to the koonj because its long and thin shape is considered graceful. Metaphorical references are also often made to the koonj for people who have ventured far from home or undertaken hazardous journeys.

The name koonj is derived from the Sanskrit word kraunch, which is a cognate Indo-European term for crane itself. In the ancient story of Valmiki, the composer of the Hindu epic Ramayana, it is claimed that his first verse was inspired by the sight of a hunter kill the male of a pair of demoiselle cranes that were courting. Observing the lovelorn female circling and crying in grief, he cursed the hunter in verse. Since tradition held that all poetry prior to this moment had been revealed rather than created by man, this verse concerning the demoiselle cranes is regarded as the first human-composed meter.

The flying formation of the koonj during migrations also inspired infantry formations in ancient India. The Mahabharata epic describes both warring sides adopting the koonj formation on the second day of the Kurukshetra War.
