= Muncar =

- District
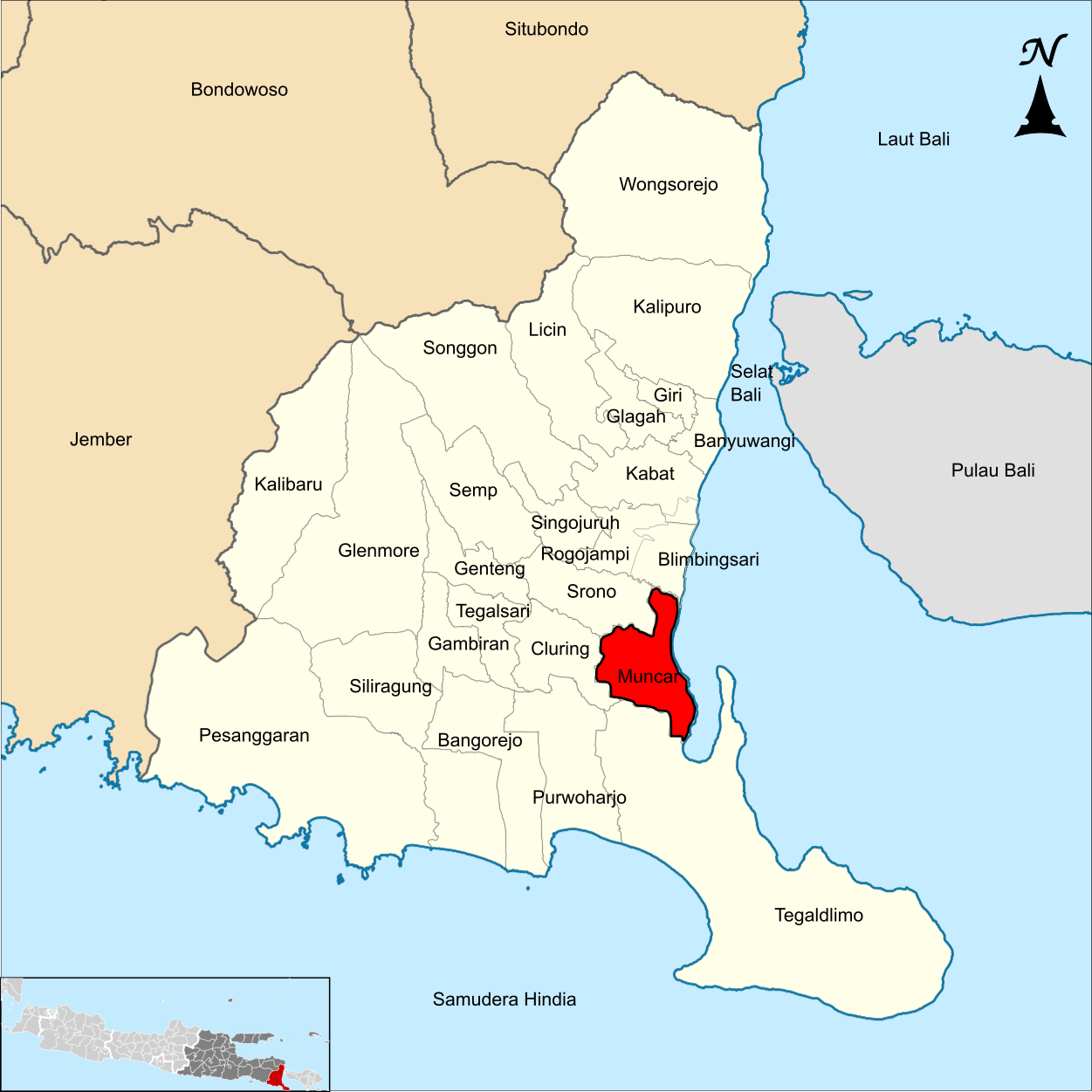
- Location in Banyuwangi Regency
- Coordinates: 8°27′S 114°19′E
- Country: Indonesia
- Province: East Java
- Regency: Banyuwangi

Area
  - Total: 146.07 km^{2} (56.40 sq mi)

Population (2020)
  - Total: 136,425
  - Density: 933.97/km^{2} (2,419.0/sq mi)
- Time zone: UTC+7 (WIB)
- Postal Code: 68472

Muncar is a district (kecamatan) in Banyuwangi Regency, East Java, Indonesia.
