= Tepu, Rajasthan =

Tepu is a panchayat village in Bap tehsil, Jodhpur District, Rajasthan, India. It consists of three villages:

- Jodhani Tepoo, population 1085
- Durjani, population 640
- Kanasi Moti, population 697

Other statistics about Tepu:

- Altitude: 188 metres (617 ft)
- Pin Code: 342301
- Telephone code: 02925
