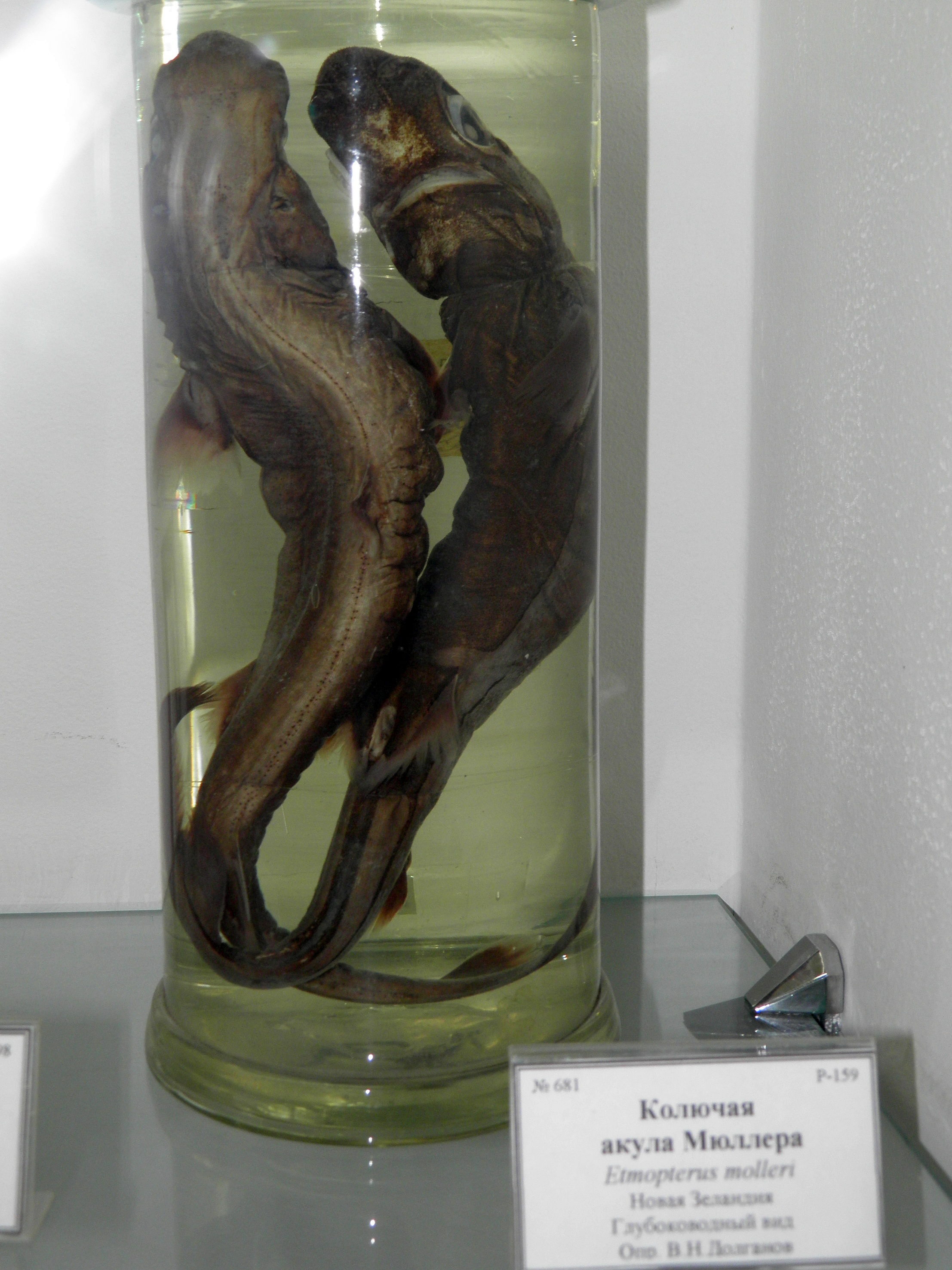

Conservation status
- Data Deficient (IUCN 3.1)

Scientific classification
- Kingdom: Animalia
- Phylum: Chordata
- Class: Chondrichthyes
- Subclass: Elasmobranchii
- Division: Selachii
- Order: Squaliformes
- Family: Etmopteridae
- Genus: Etmopterus
- Species: E. molleri

Binomial name
- Etmopterus molleri (Whitley, 1939)
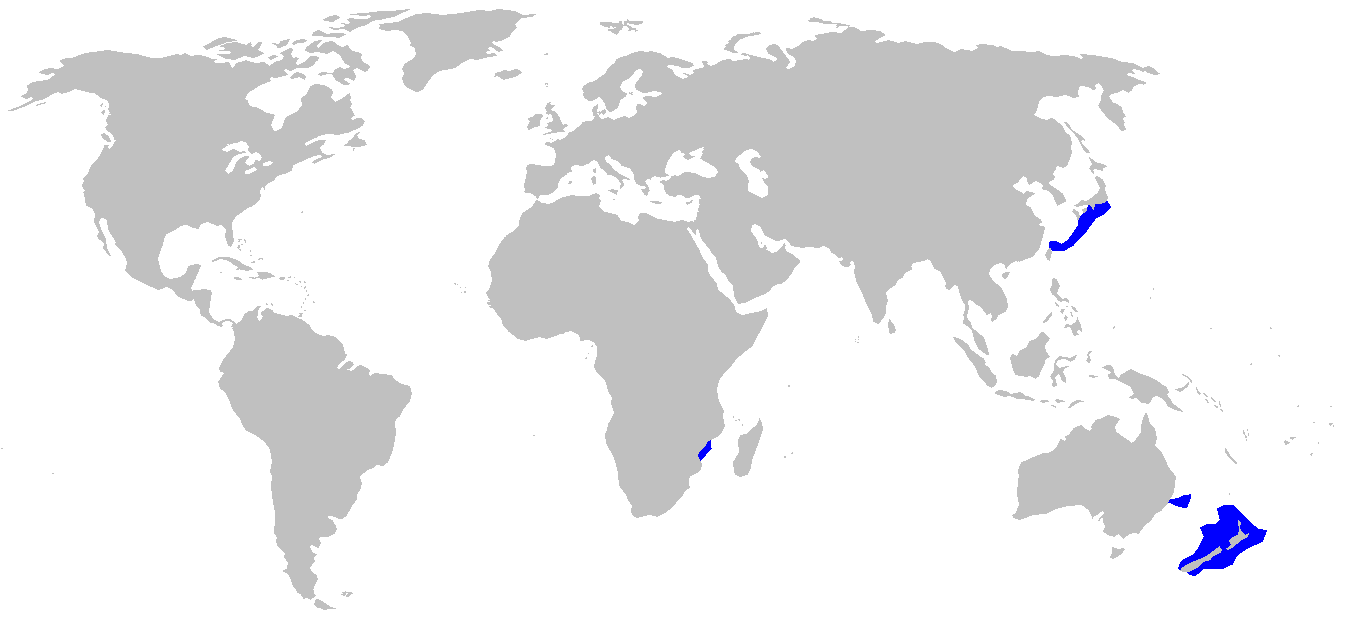
- Range of the slendertail lanternshark (in blue)

= Slendertail lanternshark =

Species of shark

The slendertail lanternshark or Moller's lanternshark (Etmopterus molleri) is a shark of the family Etmopteridae found in the western Indian Ocean between latitudes 34°N and 46°S at depths between 250 and 860 m. It can grow up to 46 cm in length.

Reproduction is presumed to be ovoviviparous.

In June 2018 the New Zealand Department of Conservation classified the slendertail lanternshark as "Data Deficient" with the qualifier "Uncertain whether Secure Overseas" under the New Zealand Threat Classification System.

== Bioluminescence ==
The slendertail lantern shark, like other members of Etmopteridae, are bioluminescent due to photophores arranged on its body. These shark's photophores produce blue light with a peak emission spectra around 475-477 nm, which matches the emission spectra of the water depth they live at. The distribution of photophores is not consistent across the shark and instead creates a distinct pattern. The proportion of total body area covered in photophores also scales with depth the sharks were captured at. This implies that there is a limit to how beneficial the slendertail's bioluminescence is at higher depths, limiting the sharks movement up the water column.

The pattern of photophores is fairly consistent among E. molleri. For example, there is a grouping of photoctytes, or cells that make up photophores, that create small, spotted lines along the base and each side of the spine. These are called spine based associated photophores or SBAPs and are found between the base of the sharks head and the toward the end of the tail. Their markings are around 2 times longer than any other type of species in Etmopteridae. There are more groupings of photophores around the sharks' eyes, gill edges, spiracles, and pectoral fins. They also have larger sections of them on the caudal, ventral, mandibular, and rostral zones of their underside. The ventral and rostral zones of the shark have a lower density of photophores compared to the pectoral and pelvic. The SBAP patterns along and on either side of the spine have a lower density compared to all four zones.

The photophores themselves depend on luciferase activity. The reaction to create light in this enzyme is based on coelenterazine and happens without any assistance of a symbiotic relationship with a microorganism, like many other bioluminescent species.

=== Hormonal Control of Bioluminescence ===
Hormonal control of bioluminescence in E. molleri and other members of the family Etmopteridae is regulated by melatonin (MT), adrenocorticotropic hormone (ACTH), prolactin (PRL), and α-melanocyte-stimulating hormone (α-MSH) in photophores. These hormones act on melanocortin receptors (MCR) including G-coupled-protein-receptors (a family of melanocortin receptors that are responsive to both α-MSH and ACTH). MT and PRL stimulate light production of photophores, while ACTH and α-MSH prevent light production. After MT was injected in photophores, injection of ACTH reduced light emissions, demonstrating an inhibitory effect.

==== cAMP modulation ====
ACTH is modulated by cyclic adenosine monophosphate (cAMP) within the photophore. As ACTH increases, cAMP levels indirectly increase which stimulates adenylate cyclase activity. When MT was injected, cAMP levels decreased in the photophore. There is evidence that cAMP further modulates activity within photophores to exert careful control over bioluminescence when it is beneficial and inhibit production when it is not longer useful.

==== Nitric oxide modulation ====
Additionally, nitric oxide (NO) is able to modulate bioluminescence in conjunction with MTL and PRL. Alone, NO is insufficient to produce luminescence but in coordination with MTL and PRL is able to modify light production. In contrast to other members of the Etmopterus genus, such as E. spinax, E. molleri expressed weaker light emissions modulated by PRL than MT. Overall, however, E. molleri require a higher threshold of either hormone to produce luminescence than E. spinax.

=== Behavioral characteristics of bioluminescence ===
Etmopterus molleri has been theorized to use its bioluminescent properties for various behavioral purposes. Due to the scarcity of direct, active research on the species, behavioral characteristics of Etmopterus molleri are not confidently confirmed. However, multiple studies have hypothesized bioluminescence as a counter-illumination strategy. In this method, Etmopterus molleri will activate and flash its photophores to defend against predators in an aposematic fashion. Bioluminescence, if not used as a counter-illumination defense, could be used similarly for camouflage. E. molleri and other Etmopterids express their bioluminescence ventrally to camouflage, which mimic similar strategies to counter-illumination. With separate studies and sources corroborating behavioral characteristics, counter-illumination and camouflage are the most likely situations for E. mollleri's bioluminescence.

Some studies name sexual selection as a possible behavioral characteristic of E. molleri. In comparison with a Kitefin shark's bioluminescent properties, E. molleri has a more widespread distribution of photophores, which would be useful in sexual selection.

Although direct behavioral purposes of bioluminescence in E. molleri are still being studied, it has been proven that bioluminescence must be triggered chemically. Duchatelet, et al. hypothesize that bioluminescence is not constitutively active in E. molleri, which means that some stimulus, be it environmental or personal, must be met to justify bioluminescence.
