= Phalodi =

- City
- Nickname: Salt City
- Location in Rajasthan, India
- Coordinates: 27.131°N 72.364°E
- Country: India
- State: Rajasthan
- District: Phalodi

Government
  - Type: Municipality
  - Body: Phalodi Municipality
- Elevation: 225 m (738 ft)

Population (2011)
  - Total: 66,978

Languages
  - Official: Marwari, Hindi, Rajasthani
- Time zone: UTC+5:30 (IST)
- PIN: 342301
- Area code: 02925
- Vehicle registration: RJ-43
- Website: Phalodi Municipality; Phalodi District

Phalodi is a city in Phalodi district in the Indian state of Rajasthan. It is the headquarters for Phalodi district. Phalodi is also called the "salt city" due to the salt industry in Rin. Phalodi is in the buffer zone of Thar Desert and often subject to extreme temperature conditions due to its arid climate. The highest temperature in the history of Phalodi is 51°C, which is the highest ever verified temperature in the country.

== History ==
Phalodi was initially called Phalvardhika. In Vikram Samvat 1515, the Brahmin Shri Siddhuji Kalla founded Phalodi by grace of Shri Maa Latiyal with named as Phalvaridhika, which was later renamed as "Phalodi" at the request of Phala, the widowed daughter of Shri Sidhu Kalla, who gave a generous contribution in cash to build the fort of Phalodi.

It is situated on the Jodhpur–Jaisalmer railway line. It is the second-largest town in the district and is also the sub-divisional headquarters. The town is situated at a distance of 142 kilometres (90 mi) from Jodhpur. The present population of the town, as per census 2001, is 44,756. Several government and semi-government offices are situated in the town. Phalodi is surrounded by Bikaner, Nagaur and Jaisalmer districts. It is well-connected via road and railway. The railway station of the town was established in 1914. National Highway 15 (India) (Pathankot–Kandla) and State Highway No. 2 (Jodhpur–Jaisalmer) pass through the town.

Khichan is well known for the migratory bird "Kurjan" (crane) which is hardly 4 kilometres (2 mi) away from Phalodi.

Phalodi was established in the mid-15th century. In 1488, a fort was constructed by Hamir Singh, the grandson of Rao Suja. He did a number of developmental works during his period. In 1230, famous Kalyan Raoji's Temple was constructed. The temple of Goddess Latiyal Devi and Shantinath are some of the oldest temples of the town. The Parsnath Jain temple, established in 1847 by the Oswal Jain community, has been made only in stone and does not have any girders or RCC construction. It is made of old Belgium glass. This Jain temple is considered a marvel in architecture (total of ten Jain temples and six dadabadis).

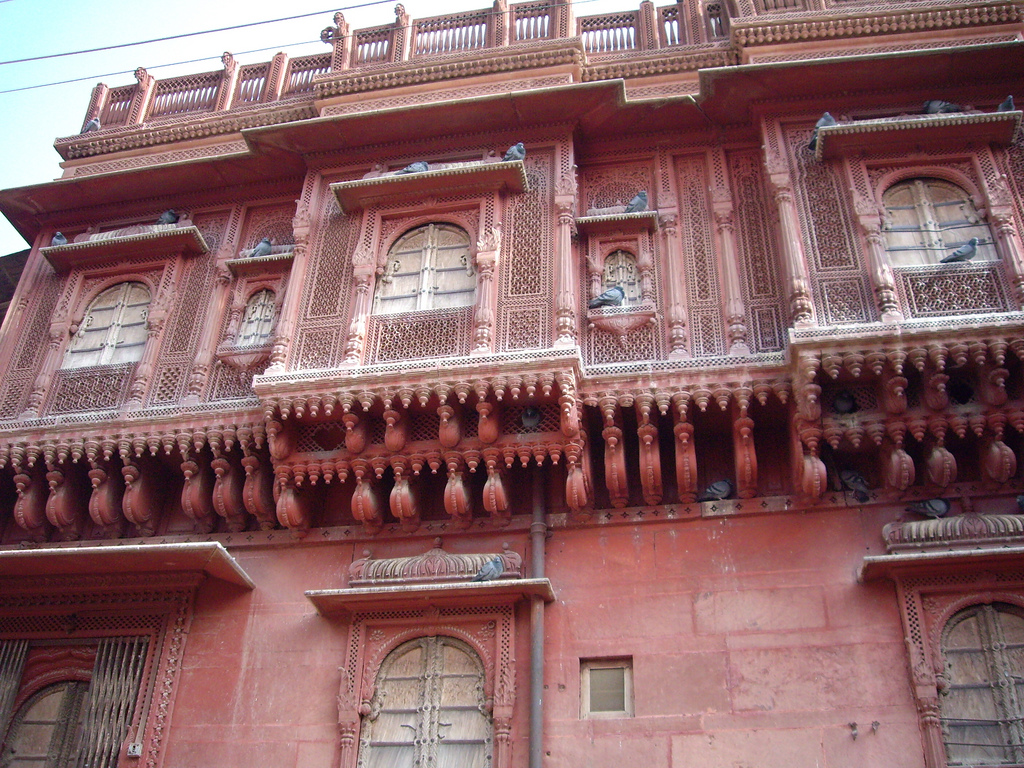
A Haveli in Phalodi, Rajasthan

Initially it was a part of Bikaner State. In 1615, it came under the control of Rao Sur Singh of Jodhpur State under the directorate of Shah Jahan and thereafter remained a part of the state of Jodhpur.

The stone epigraphical inscriptions in the Kalyanji-Ka- Mandir indicate existence of a town called as Vijay Nagar Patan, which is now known as Phalodi. In 2008 a major renovation was done in the Latiyal Mata Temple, and a silver throne (singhasan) for Latiyal Mata was made.

Phalodi also has a large number of communities living in it. The majority in rural areas of Phalodi are Sindhi Muslims and in city Pushkarna Brahman lived. Small industries flourish in Phalodi. The town is well known for the large number of industries for the production of sodium salt and plaster of Paris. Phalodi is one of India's largest salt suppliers.

== Climate ==
The climate of Phalodi is generally hot and arid, but with a rainy season from late June to September (Köppen BWh).

Temperatures are extreme throughout the period from March to October, except when monsoonal rain produces thick clouds to lower it slightly. In the months of April, May and June, high temperatures routinely exceed 40 degrees Celsius. During the monsoon season, average temperatures decrease slightly. However, the city's generally low humidity rises and this adds to the normal discomfort from the heat. The highest temperatures recorded in Phalodi during 2016 summers from 18 May to 21 May when it rose up to 51 degrees Celsius, which is the current national record.

Climate data for Phalodi (1991–2020, extremes 1940–present)
Month	Jan	Feb	Mar	Apr	May	Jun	Jul	Aug	Sep	Oct	Nov	Dec	Year
Record high °C (°F)	33.6 (92.5)	39.5 (103.1)	43.2 (109.8)	47.0 (116.6)	48.8 (119.8)	49.0 (120.2)	47.5 (117.5)	46.0 (114.8)	45.0 (113.0)	43.0 (109.4)	39.6 (103.3)	34.4 (93.9)	49.0 (120.2)
Mean daily maximum °C (°F)	24.1 (75.4)	28.1 (82.6)	34.1 (93.4)	39.3 (102.7)	42.7 (108.9)	41.9 (107.4)	38.9 (102.0)	37.1 (98.8)	38.0 (100.4)	37.1 (98.8)	32.0 (89.6)	26.7 (80.1)	34.9 (94.8)
Mean daily minimum °C (°F)	6.4 (43.5)	10.0 (50.0)	15.9 (60.6)	21.2 (70.2)	25.2 (77.4)	26.7 (80.1)	26.0 (78.8)	25.0 (77.0)	23.8 (74.8)	19.6 (67.3)	13.0 (55.4)	8.1 (46.6)	18.3 (64.9)
Record low °C (°F)	−3.3 (26.1)	0.0 (32.0)	1.7 (35.1)	11.4 (52.5)	13.5 (56.3)	15.5 (59.9)	18.0 (64.4)	18.8 (65.8)	17.0 (62.6)	8.9 (48.0)	4.0 (39.2)	−2.5 (27.5)	−3.3 (26.1)
Average rainfall mm (inches)	0.8 (0.03)	3.0 (0.12)	2.3 (0.09)	3.6 (0.14)	7.4 (0.29)	34.5 (1.36)	84.0 (3.31)	74.1 (2.92)	16.6 (0.65)	0.5 (0.02)	0.4 (0.02)	2.0 (0.08)	225.2 (8.87)
Average rainy days	0.1	0.2	0.1	0.1	0.6	2.2	3.1	4.6	2.1	0.0	0.0	0.1	13.2
Average relative humidity (%) (at 17:30 IST)	39	32	27	22	23	29	42	47	37	28	30	37	33
Source: India Meteorological Department

== Transportation ==
Phalodi railway station lies on the broad gauge line of the Delhi–Jaisalmer line. Trains passing through Phalodi include:

- Jaisalmer to Mumbai (Bandra Terminus)
- Bikaner to Jaisalmer
- Delhi to Jaisalmer
- Jodhpur to Jaisalmer.

Phalodi is connected to Jodhpur (135 km (84 mi) south), Bikaner (156 km (97 mi) north), Nagaur (145 km (90 mi) in east) and Jaisalmer (165 km (103 mi) in west). National Highway 15 skirts around Phalodi. Bus services have run continuously from Jodhpur and Bikaner, both three hours away. There are a number of cabs or taxis that ferry passengers from these places.

On last Dec 2013, Phalodi/Jaisalmer was directly connected with Mumbai with weekly train, train running from Bandra Terminus (Mumbai) on every Friday on 2:35pm afternoon and it reached Phalodi on 9:35am morning.

Phalodi's airport is 25 km from the city and is under Air Force and inaccessible to the general public. The nearest civilian airport being Jodhpur which is 130 km and Jaipur which is 300 km away from the city.

The city is very well connected via highways to other cities like Jodhpur, Jaisalmer, Ramdevra, and others.

== Demographics ==
As of the 2011 census of India, Phalodi had a population of 49,766, of which 26,003 and 23,763 are males and females respectively. Phalodi has an average literacy rate of 61.81%, lower than the national average of 74.04%: male literacy is 69.63%, and female literacy is 53.25%. In Phalodi, 15.5% of the population is under 6 years of age.

== Betting Market (Satta Bazaar) ==
Phalodi is the nerve centre of betting, especially election related betting in Rajasthan. The bookies in Phalodi are renowned for being accurate more often than not.

== See also ==
- Phalodi Solar Power Plant
