= Phalodi district =

District in the Jodhpur division of the Rajasthan state of India

- District
- Phalodi District in Rajasthan
- Coordinates: 27°08′30″N 72°26′10″E
- Country: India
- State: Rajasthan
- Division: Jodhpur Division
- Established: 7 August 2023
- Headquarters: Phalodi

Government
  - District Collector & Magistrate: Shweta Chouhan, IAS
  - Superintendent of Police: Kundan Karwaria, IPS
- Time zone: UTC+05:30 (IST)
- Lok Sabha constituencies: Jodhpur Lok Sabha constituency

Phalodi district is one of the six districts in the Jodhpur division of the Rajasthan state of India. This district is known for its salt industry, and it is one of the hottest places in India. The city of Phalodi is the administrative headquarters of the district.

== History ==
Phalodi District was established on 7 August 2023. The area was formerly part of Jodhpur District.

== Administrative divisions ==
Phalodi has 8 tehsils:

- Aau
- Bap
- Bapini
- Dechoo
- Ghantiyali
- Lohawat
- Phalodi
- Setrawa
