= Doh Kyung-soo discography =

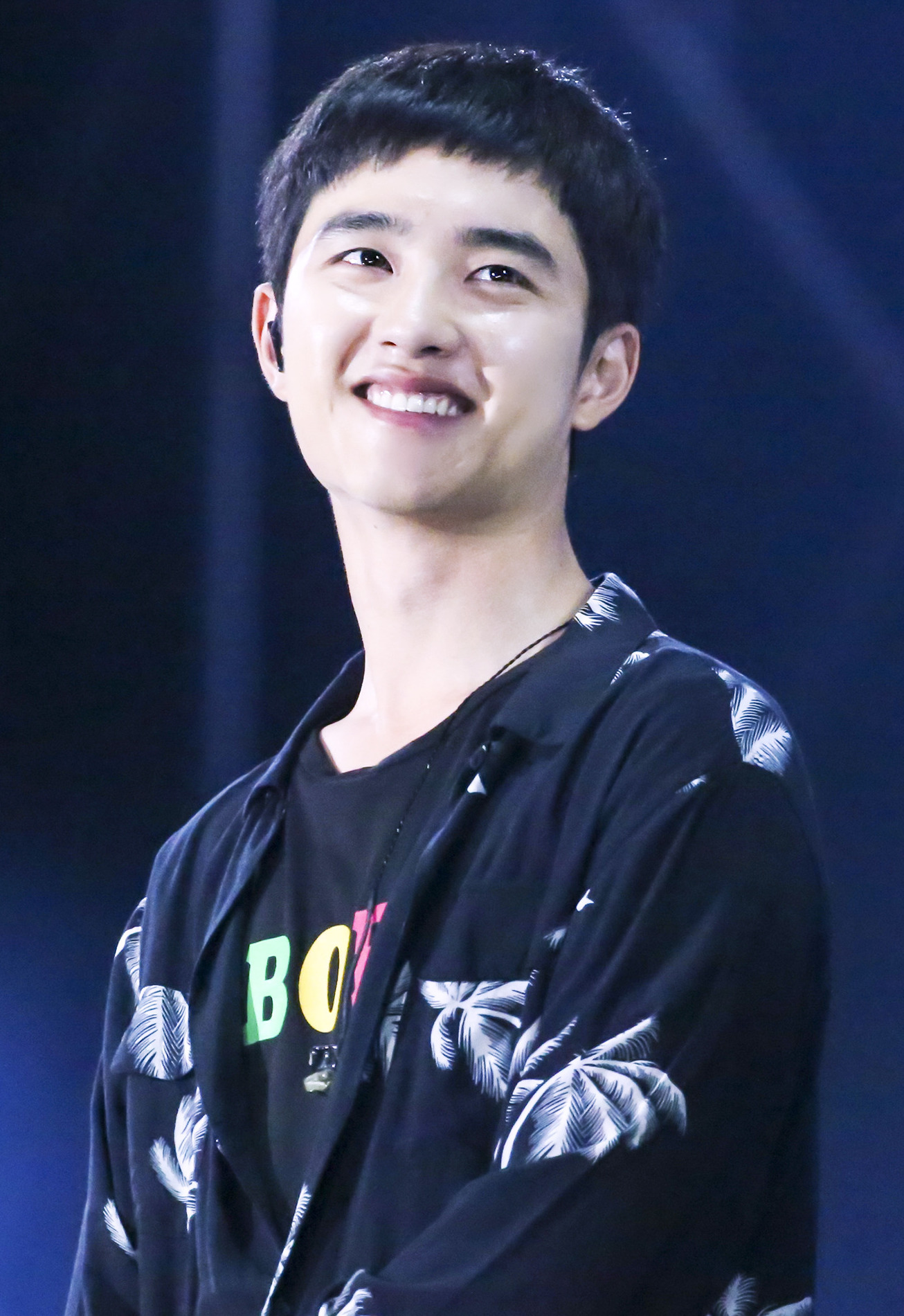
- D.O. at the Lotte Family concert in Seoul on June 23, 2018.
- Studio albums: 1
- EPs: 3
- Singles: 9
- Collaborations: 2
- Soundtrack appearances: 6

South Korean singer and actor Doh Kyung-soo has released one studio album, four extended plays (EPs), and nine singles (including two as featured artist). In addition, he has collaborations and soundtracks for television series and films.

== Studio albums ==
List of studio albums, showing selected details, selected chart positions, and sales figures
Title	Details	Peak chart positions	Sales
Title	Details	KOR	Sales
Bliss	Released: July 7, 2025; Label: Company SooSoo; Formats: CD, digital download, streaming	4	KOR: 89,693

== Extended plays ==
List of extended plays, showing selected details, selected chart positions, sales figures, and certifications
Title	Details	Peak chart positions			Sales	Certifications
Title	Details	KOR	JPN Oricon	JPN Hot	Sales	Certifications
Empathy	Released: July 26, 2021; Label: SM, Dreamus; Formats: CD, digital download, streaming	1	4	10	KOR: 380,178; CHN: 84,770 (Dig.); JPN: 26,590 (Phy.)	KMCA: Platinum
Expectation	Released: September 18, 2023; Label: SM, Kakao; Formats: CD, digital download, streaming	3	8	7	KOR: 214,264; JPN: 8,440 (Phy.)	
Blossom	Released: May 7, 2024; Label: Company SooSoo; Formats: CD, digital download, streaming	2	26	13	KOR: 147,461; JPN: 1,185	
Dopamine	Released: September 8, 2026; Label: Blitzway; Formats: CD, digital download, streaming	5	—	—	KOR: 192,000	

== Singles ==
=== As lead artist ===
List of singles, showing year released, selected chart positions, and name of the album
Title	Year	Peak chart positions		Album
Title	Year	KOR	US World	Album
"That's Okay"	2019	12	11	SM Station Season 3
"Rose"	2021	33	16	Empathy
"I Do" (별 떨어진다)	2023	25	11	Expectation
"Somebody"	2023	47	—	Expectation
"Popcorn"	2024	12	—	Blossom
"Mars"	2024	98	—	Blossom
"Snowfall at Night"	2025	134	7	Non-album single
"Sing Along!"	2025	100	—	Bliss
"Dumb" (featuring Penomeco)	2025	— (Note: Did not enter Circle Digital Chart but peaked at number 22 on Circle Download Chart)	—	Non-album single
"Guitarist"	2026	26	—	Dopamine
"Darling"	2026	176	—	Non-album single
"—" denotes a recording that did not chart or was not released in that territory.

=== As featured artist ===
List of singles as featured artist, showing year released, selected chart positions, sales figures, and name of the album
Title	Year	Peak chart positions						Sales (DL)	Album
Title	Year	KOR	HK	MLY	PHL	TWN	WW	Sales (DL)	Album
"Goodbye Summer" (f(x) featuring D.O.)	2013	7	—	—	—	—	—	KOR: 292,583	Pink Tape
"Small Girl" (Lee Young-ji featuring D.O.)	2024	1	15	22	94	2	38	N/A	16 Fantasy
"—" denotes a recording that did not chart or was not released in that territory.

==== Collaborations ====
List of collaborations, showing year released, selected chart positions, sales figures, and name of the album
Title	Year	Peak chart positions		Sales (DL)	Album
Title	Year	KOR	US World	Sales (DL)	Album
"Tell Me (What Is Love)" (with Yoo Young-jin)	2016	12	2	KOR: 145,281	SM Station Season 1
"If It Were Me" (나였으면) (with Na Yoon-kwon)	2025	63	—	—N/a	Non-album single
"—" denotes a recording that did not chart or was not released in that territory.

=== Soundtracks ===
List of soundtracks, showing year released, selected chart positions, sales figures, and name of the album
Title	Year	Peak chart positions	Sales (DL)	Album
Title	Year	KOR	Sales (DL)	Album
"Dear My Family" (with SM Town)	2012	—	N/A	I AM. OST
"Crying Out"	2014	22	KOR: 79,688	Cart OST
"Don't Worry" (with Jo Jung-suk)	2016	100	KOR: 19,498	My Annoying Brother OST
"Bite"	2022	— (Note: Did not enter Circle Digital Chart but peaked at number 44 on Circle Download Chart)	N/A	Bad Prosecutor OST
"Forever" (영원해)	2025	41	N/A	Resident Playbook OST
"Dream High" (with Suzy, Jeong Dong-won, feat. Lim Se-jun, Yoon Seo-bin)	2025	— (Note: Did not enter Circle Digital Chart but peaked at number 47 on Circle Download Chart)	N/A	Show Musical Dream High OST
"—" denotes a recording that did not chart or was not released in that territory.

== Other songs ==
List of songs, showing chart positions, year released, sales figures and album name
Title	Year	Peak chart positions	Sales (DL)	Album
Title	Year	KOR	Sales (DL)	Album
"Tell Me What Is Love"	2014	44	KOR: 29,668	Exology Chapter 1: The Lost Planet
"For Life" (English version)	2019	—	N/A	Exo Planet 4 - The Elyxion (dot)
"I'm Gonna Love You" (featuring Wonstein)	2021	99	N/A	Empathy
"My Love"	2021	117	N/A	Empathy
"It's Love" (다시, 사랑이야)	2021	127	N/A	Empathy
"I'm Fine"	2021	129	N/A	Empathy
"Dad" (나의 아버지)	2021	139	N/A	Empathy
"Rose" (English version)	2021	196	N/A	Empathy
"Wonder" (기적)	2023	192	N/A	Expectation
"Lost"	2023	— (Note: "Lost" did not enter the Circle Digital Chart, but it peaked at number 28 on the Circle Download Chart.)	N/A	Expectation
"Ordinary Days" (내일의 우리)	2023	159	N/A	Expectation
"The View"	2023	— (Note: "The View" did not enter the Circle Digital Chart, but it peaked at number 30 on the Circle Download Chart.)	N/A	Expectation
"Lost" (Acoustic version)	2023	— (Note: "Lost" (Acoustic version) did not enter the Circle Digital Chart, but it peaked at number 35 on the Circle Download Chart.)	N/A	Expectation
"Simple Joys" (우리가 몰랐던 것들)	2024	— (Note: "Simple Joys" did not enter the Circle Digital Chart, but it peaked at number 39 on the Circle Download Chart.)	N/A	Blossom
"Good Night" (오늘에게)	2024	— (Note: "Good Night" did not enter the Circle Digital Chart, but it peaked at number 40 on the Circle Download Chart.)	N/A	Blossom
"My Dear" (매일의 고백)	2024	— (Note: "My Dear" did not enter the Circle Digital Chart, but it peaked at number 44 on the Circle Download Chart.)	N/A	Blossom
"About Time" (어제의 너, 오늘의 나)	2024	— (Note: "About Time" did not enter the Circle Digital Chart, but it peaked at number 42 on the Circle Download Chart.)	N/A	Blossom
"—" denotes a recording that did not chart or was not released in that territory.

== Songwriting credits ==
All credits are adapted from KOMCA's database, unless cited otherwise.

Song	Year	Artist	Album	Credits
"That's Okay"	2019	D.O.	SM Station Season 3	Co-writer
"Rose"	2021	D.O.	Empathy	Co-writer
"I'm Fine"	2021	D.O.	Empathy	Co-writer
"Dumb" feat. Penomeco	2025	D.O.	Non-album single	Co-writer
