= I Do (D.O. song) =

Single by D.O.

from the EP Expectation
- Language: Korean
- Released: September 8, 2023
- Recorded: 2023
- Studio: SM Yellow Tail (Seoul)
- Genre: Acoustic pop
- Length: 2:43
- Label: SM; Kakao
- Composers: Ryan S. Jhun; Kristoffer Tømmerbakke; Peder Elias; Jeon Myung-hoon; Park Min-soo
- Lyricist: Song U
- Producers: Ryan S. Jhun; Kristoffer Tømmerbakke

D.O. singles chronology
"Rose" (2021)	"I Do" (2023)	"Somebody" (2023)

Music video
- "I Do" on YouTube

"I Do" (별 떨어진다; Byeol tteoreojinda; 'A star is falling') is a song recorded by South Korean singer-actor, D.O. that was released on September 8, 2023, by SM Entertainment and distributed by Kakao Entertainment as the pre-release single for D.O.'s second EP, Expectation.

== Background ==
D.O. debuted as a soloist through debut EP Empathy on July 26, 2021, with lead single "Rose".

In 2022, D.O primarily focused on television roles. In May, he appeared in Off the Grid, an unscripted travel documentary series. In October, he starred in legal drama television series, Bad Prosecutor and sang one of the series' soundtrack, "Bite".

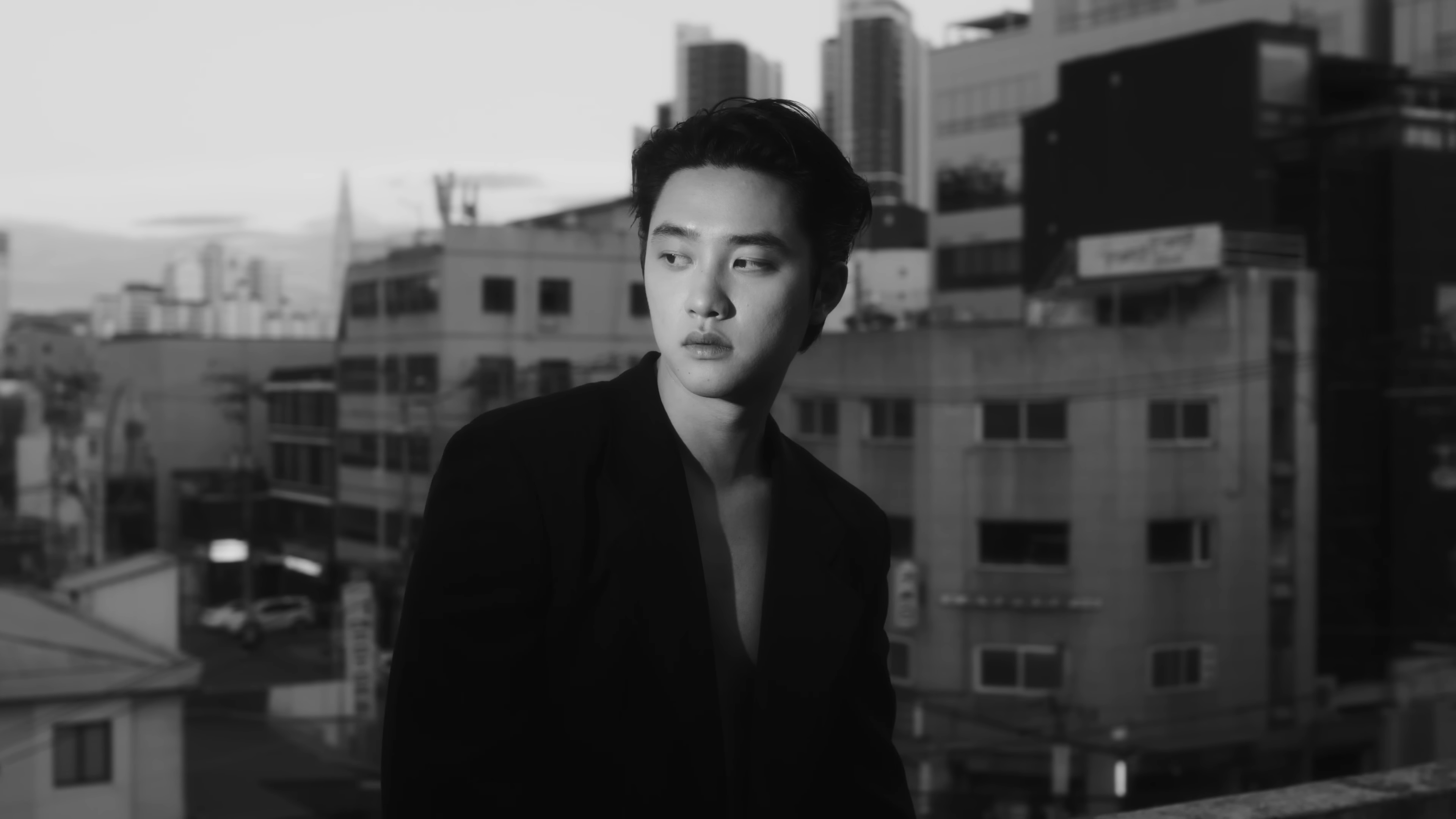
D.O with Marie Claire Korea in August 2023

On September 1, 2023, SM announced that D.O. will have a comeback on September 18, the first comeback in two years and two months after his debut EP. The comeback schedule poster was released on September 4 and "I Do" was announced as the pre-release single scheduled to be released on September 8.

The song and its music video were released on September 8, with the latter described as the continuation for the music video of "That's Okay" which was released in 2019.

== Composition ==
"I Do" is an acoustic pop song with a rhythmic melody produced by Ryan S. Jhun and Kristoffer Tømmerbakke. The lyrics are penned by Song U, narrating the desire of being close to the loved ones while enjoying meteor shower.

The song was co-composed by Jhun, Tømmerbakke, Peder Elias, Jeon Myung-hoon, and Park Min-soo, and arranged by the former two.

== Music video ==
The music video was released on September 8 on SM's YouTube channel. Described as the continuation of "That's Okay" music video, the video shows an animated couple enjoying their time together as the day progressed.

== Commercial performance ==
"I Do" peaked domestically on the Circle Chart at number 25. Overseas, it peaked at number 11 in the World Digital Song Sales chart.

== Live performances ==
"I Do" is included in the set list for D.O.'s first Asia fan meeting concert, "Bloom" in 2024.

== Charts ==
Chart performance for "I Do"
Chart (2023)	Peak position
South Korea (Circle)	25
US World Digital Song Sales (Billboard)	11

== Credits and personnel ==
Credits adapted from the EP's liner notes.

Studio

- SM Yellow Tail Studio – recording, digital editing
- SM Blue Ocean Studio – mixing
- 821 Sound Mastering – mastering

Personnel

- SM Entertainment – executive producer
- Ryan S. Jhun – producer, composition, arrangement, programming, synthesizer
- Kristoffer Tømmerbakke – producer, composition, arrangement
- Peder Elias – composition
- Jeon Myung-hoon – composition
- Park Min-soo – composition
- Song U – lyrics
- Doh Kyung-soo – vocals, background vocals
- Noh Min-ji – recording, digital audio editing
- Seo Mi-rae – vocal direction, engineered for mix
- Kim Chul-soon – mixing
- Kwon Nam-woo – mastering

== Release history ==
Release history for "I Do"
Region	Date	Format	Label
South Korea	September 8, 2023	Digital download; streaming	SM; Kakao
Various	September 8, 2023	Digital download; streaming	SM
