= Somebody (D.O. song) =

Single by D.O.

from the EP Expectation
- Language: Korean
- Released: September 18, 2023
- Recorded: 2023
- Studio: SM Starlight (Seoul)
- Genre: Folk-pop
- Length: 2:39
- Label: SM; Kakao
- Composers: Aaron Wagner; Levi Hummon; Drew Schueler
- Lyricist: Kang Eun-jeong
- Producer: Aaron Wagner

D.O. singles chronology
| "I Do" (2023) | "Somebody" (2023) | "Popcorn" (2024) |

Music videos
- "Somebody" on YouTube
- "Somebody" (Live clip) on YouTube

"Somebody" is a song recorded by South Korean singer-actor, D.O. that was released on September 18, 2023, by SM Entertainment and distributed by Kakao Entertainment as the lead single for his second EP, Expectation.

== Background ==
On September 1, 2023, SM announced that D.O. will have a comeback on September 18, the first comeback in two years and two months after his debut EP. The comeback schedule poster was released on September 4 and "I Do" was announced as the pre-release single scheduled to be released on September 8, and "Somebody" would be released simulatenously with the EP on September 18.

On September 11, SM uploaded the first teaser image of D.O. in a library. The teaser for the music video was released on SM Town YouTube channel on September 17, and revealed that the music video will feature actress Lee Jae-in.

The song was released alongside the music video during the EP's release on September 18.

== Composition ==
"Somebody" is a folk-pop song with the rhythm of acoustic guitar accompanying it. It was co-composed by Aaron Wagner, Levi Hummon, and Drew Schueler, and arranged by Wagner in the key of C# major with the tempo of 89 beats per minute.

The lyrics were written by Kang Eun-jeong, expressing the desire to meet someone that loves a person for who they are, not what they are.

== Music video ==
The music video was released on September 18 and uploaded into SM Town YouTube channel. The video stars D.O. as a cameraman on set and begins to fell in love with one of the actresses (Lee Jae-in) and they formed a friendship afterwards.

On September 20, Exo's YouTube channel uploaded a live clip video of D.O. performing "Somebody".

== Critical reception ==
Debashree Dutta of Rolling Stone India gave the song a positive review, calling it "soulful, smooth, satisfying", and delivered in D.O.'s trademark expressiveness.

== Commercial performance ==
"Somebody" peaked domestically on the Circle Chart at number 47.

== Live performances ==
On September 22, D.O. performed "Somebody" live for the first time before studio audience of KBS2' The Seasons hosted by AKMU.

"Somebody" is included in the set list for D.O.'s first Asia fan meeting concert, "Bloom" in 2024.

== Chart ==
Chart performance for "Somebody"
| Chart (2023) | Peak position |
|---|---|
| South Korea (Circle) | 47 |

== Credits and personnel ==
Credits adapted from the EP's liner notes.

Studio

- SM Starlight Studio – recording, digital editing
- SM Blue Cup Studio – mixing
- 821 Sound Mastering – mastering

Personnel

- SM Entertainment – executive producer
- Aaron Wagner – producer, composition, arrangement, programming, synthesizer
- Levi Hummon – composition
- Drew Schueler – composition
- Kang Eun-jeong – lyrics
- Doh Kyung-soo – vocals, background vocals
- Ju Chan-yang – vocal direction
- Jeong Yoo-ra – recording, digital audio editing
- Jung Eui-seok – mixing, engineered for mix
- Kwon Nam-woo – mastering

== Release history ==
Release history for "Somebody"
| Region | Date | Format | Label |
|---|---|---|---|
| South Korea | September 18, 2023 | Digital download; streaming | SM; Kakao |
| Various | September 18, 2023 | Digital download; streaming | SM |
