= Kristoffer Tømmerbakke =

Norwegian record producer, songwriter, and rapper (born 1983)

Kriss Tømmerbakke
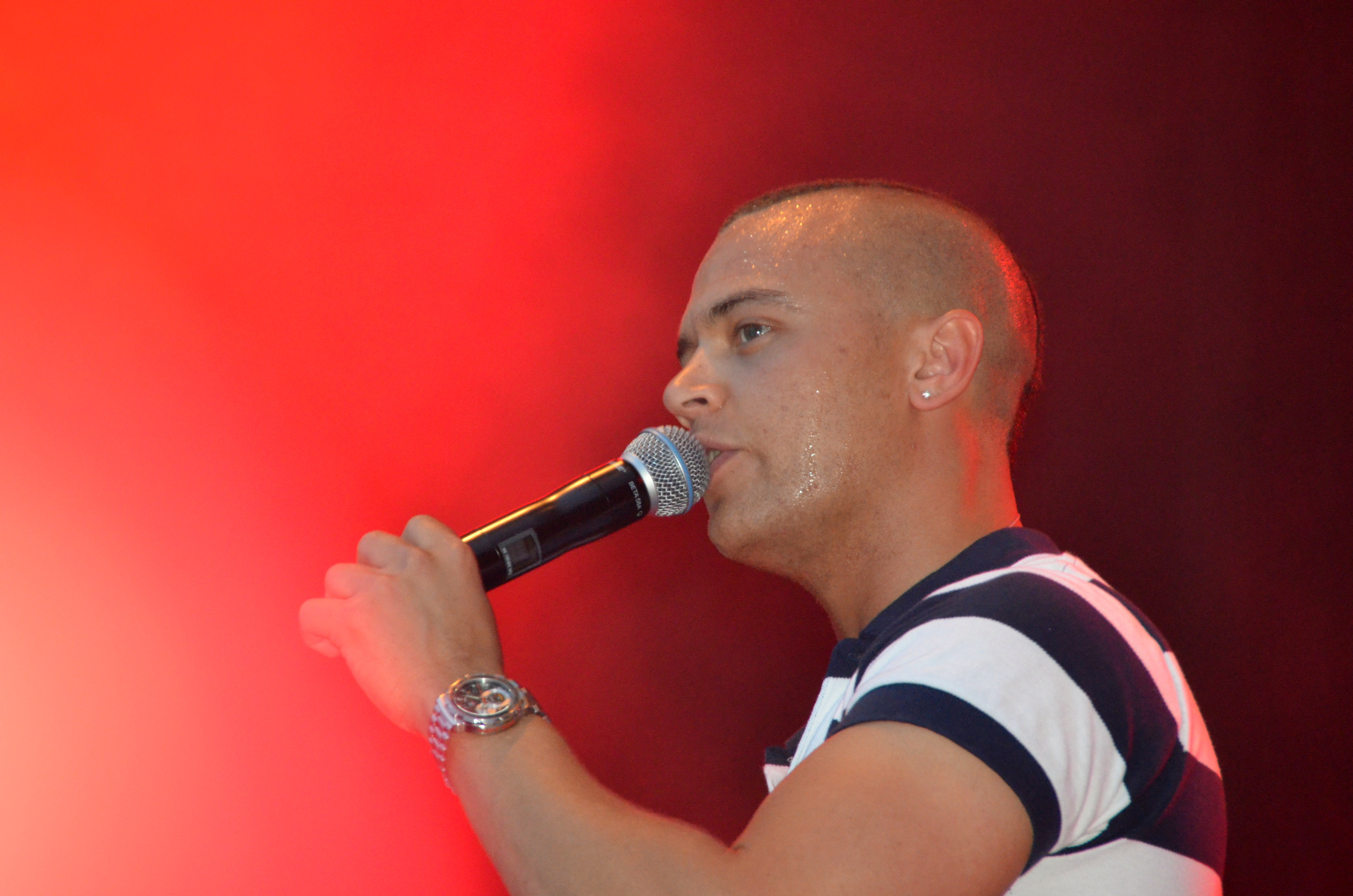
- Tømmerbakke in 2011

Background information
- Also known as: Kriss, K&S, GoToGuy
- Born: Kristoffer Chaka Bwanausi Tømmerbakke; 23 June 1983 (age 42); Bærum
- Genres: Dance, pop, EDM
- Occupation(s): Producer, songwriter, rapper, certified wine enthusiast

Kristoffer Chaka Bwanausi Tømmerbakke (born 23 June 1983). better known by his stage name Kriss, is a Norwegian producer, songwriter and rapper. He got his break as half of the rap duo Erik & Kriss in 2007, one of the most successful Norwegian artists over the past decade. Tømmerbakke has since written and produced eight Top10 singles in Norway as part of the group.

Kriss took his first steps internationally with a Swedish Spotify #1 with the artist Kamferdrops in 2017, and saw his international stock rise with his work on Robin Schulz feat Alida “In Your Eyes” that hit #1 on Billboard Dance. The track was also at the Global 100 on Spotify (peaking at #86th), and reaching Top10 in Germany, Austria and Switzerland.

Kriss followed up working with R3HAB, Alok (DJ), W&W, Lucas & Steve, Kriss has also produced, written for and collaborated with Moti, Mohombi, Brooks, LVNDSCAPE, Felix Cartal and Broiler. Tømmerbakke works closely with producer/writer Erik Smaaland in the production duo GoToGuy.

Tømmerbakke has also worked with K-pop group Twice, on their EP Taste of Love (EP), which reached #6 on the Billboard Top 200, and #2 in the Korean Album Charts.

Year	Title	Artist	Album	Credits
2020	One More Dance	R3HAB x Alida	Non-album single	Co-writer
2020	In Your Eyes (feat. Alida)	Robin Schulz	IIII	Co-writer
2021	Love Again	Alok & Vize	Non-album single	Co-writer
2021	One More Time (feat. Alida)	Robin Schulz & Felix Jaehn	IIII	Co-writer
2021	Scandal	TWICE	Taste Of Love (EP)	Producer & co-writer
2021	Another Level	Timmy Trumpet	Non-album single	Co-producer and co-writer
2021	The Portrait (Oh La La)	R3HAB & Gabry Ponte	Non-album single	Co-writer
2021	Real Love	Dillon Francis & Aleyna Tilki	Lead single of album Happy Machine	Co-producer and co-writer
2021	Swimming In Your Eyes	Dynoro	Non-album single	Co-producer and co-writer
2021	Most People	R3hab & Lukas Graham	Non-album single	Co-producer and co-writer
2021	Close Your Eyes	Kshmr & Tungevaag	Non-album single	Co-writer
2021	Out Of Love	Alan Walker & Au/Ra	World of Walker	Co-writer
2022	Headlights	Alok, Alan Walker feat Kiddo	Non-album single	co-producer and co-writer
2022	In My Dreams	Red Velvet (group)	The ReVe Festival 2022 – Feel My Rhythm	co-producer and co-writer
2022	Perfect Melody	Jonas Blue, Julian Perretta	Non-album single	co-producer and co-writer
2023	Forget You (with Gabry Ponte)	Lumix (DJ), ALIDA, Gabry Ponte	Non-album single	co-producer and co-writer
2023	Body Talk	Ofenbach, SVEA	Non-album single	producer and co-writer
2023	Shine With Me	IVE	I've IVE	producer and co-writer
2023	Rock my Body	R3HAB, INNA, SASH!	Non-album single	producer and co-writer
2023	Bad Blood	Nana, Sangah, Suyun, Yeeun, Wooyeon, Kei	Queendom Puzzle All-Rounder Battle 2	co-producer and co-writer
2023	I Do	D.O.	Expectation	producer and co-writer
2023	Bad Reputation	Jini	An Iron Hand In A Velvet Glove	co-writer
2024	Summer's Back	ALOK, Jess Glynne	Non-album single	co-producer and co-writer
2025	Diamond Heart	Bennett, Timmy Trumpet	Non-album single	co-producer and co-writer
