= Small Girl =

Single by Lee Young-ji featuring Doh Kyung-soo

from the EP 16 Fantasy
- Language: English; Korean
- Released: June 21, 2024
- Studio: In Grid (Seoul)
- Genre: Hip hop; R&B
- Length: 3:10
- Label: Mainstream
- Composers: Lee Young-ji; Peejay
- Lyricist: Lee Young-ji
- Producer: Peejay

Lee Young-ji singles chronology
"Dejavu (Prod. Slom)" (2022)	"Small Girl" (2024)	"Unknown Guy" (2024)

Doh Kyung-soo singles chronology
"Mars" (2024)	"Small Girl" (2024)	"Snowfall at Night" (2025)

Music video
- "Small Girl" on YouTube

"Small Girl" is a song by South Korean rapper Lee Young-ji featuring singer Doh Kyung-soo. It was released on June 21, 2024, by Mainstream as the lead single of her debut EP, 16 Fantasy (2024). "Small Girl" topped South Korean Circle Digital Chart and peaked at number 38 on the Billboard Global 200.

== Background ==
On June 10, 2024, Lee announced the upcoming release of her debut EP 16 Fantasy on June 21. Four days later, she announced that singer Doh Kyung-soo of boy band Exo would be the featured singer of the song.

== Composition ==
The lyrics of the song was entirely penned by Lee herself. She collaborated with music producer Peejay for the composition. The song is primarily performed in English, narrating Lee's experience dating boyfriends who were around the same height or a little shorter than her. The song highlights her admiration and envy of shorter girls whilst discussing her inability to conform to societal standards. Lee claimed to have written the song right away after being annoyed when a little girl asked her how she was doing.

== Critical reception ==
Music critic Jung Min-jae gave the song a positive review highlighting Lee's narrations that provide comfort and solidarity.

== Music video ==
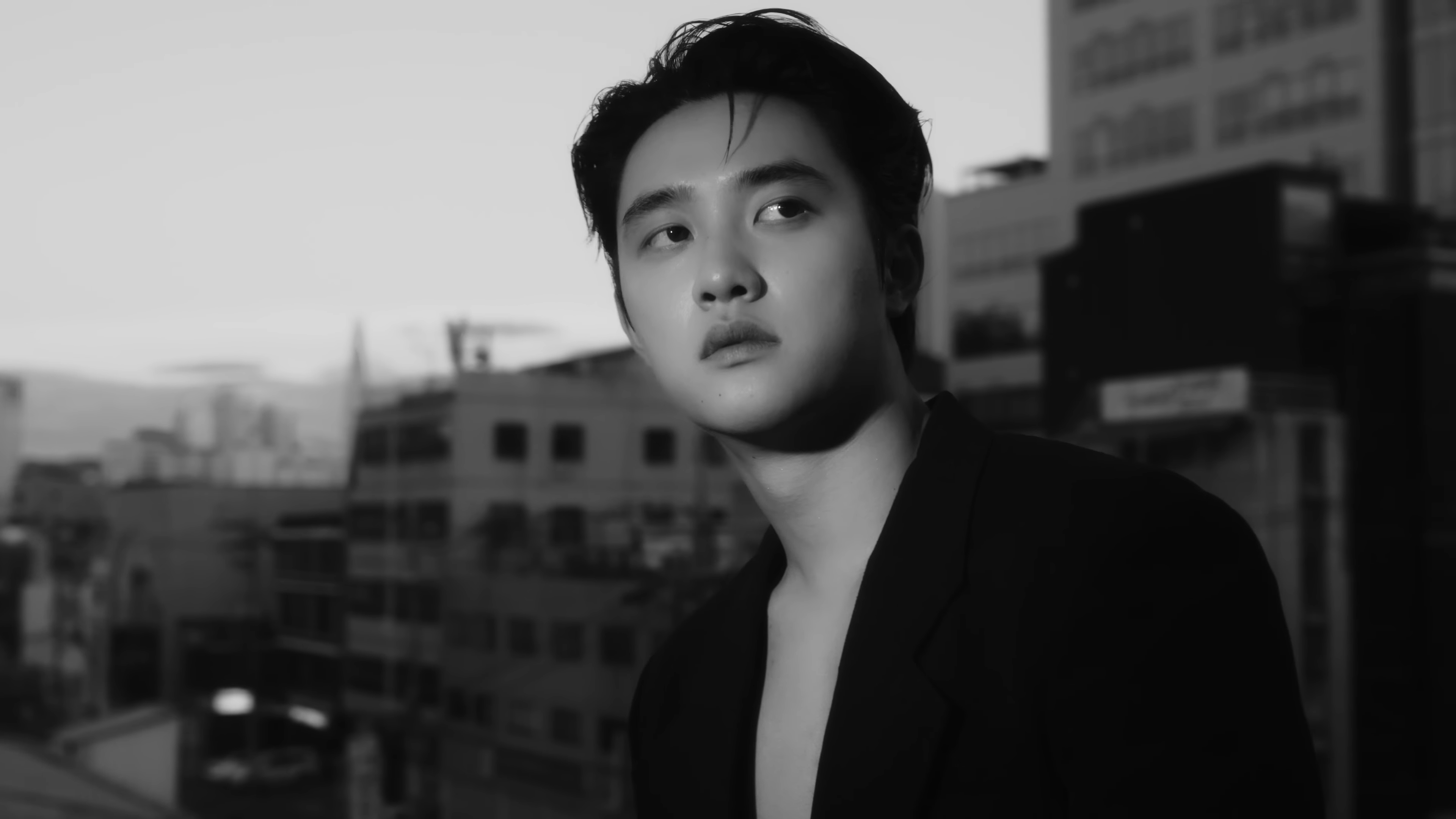
Singer Doh Kyung-soo is featured on "Small Girl" and its music video

The music video was released on the same day as the song. Within two days, the music video already surpassed two million views. The music video received backlash from some fans as it featured a cheek kissing scene between Lee and Doh. During an interview with Na Young-seok, Lee clarified that the scene was discussed beforehand. Following the backlash, the director of the music video stated that it was okay to scrap the scene since the rapper "wished to not be hated and meet an untimely death", although ultimately the video remained aired as it was.

== Credits ==
Musicians

- Lee Young-ji – vocals, lyrics, composition
- Peejay – producer, composition, arrangement, drum, keyboard and piano, synthesizer
- Koo Young-jun – guitar
- Ikbbo – bass
- Doh Kyung-soo – vocals

Technical personnel

- MoZ – recording
- Jung Eun-kyung – recording
- Kwon Nam-woo – mastering
- Ko Hyun-jung – mixing
  - Ji Min-woo – mixing assistant
  - Kim Joon-young – mixing assistant

Studios

- Ingrid Studio – recording
- Kokosound Studio – mixing
- 821 Sound – mastering

== Charts ==
=== Weekly charts ===
Weekly chart performance
Chart (2024)	Peak position
Global 200 (Billboard)	38
Hong Kong (Billboard)	15
Malaysia (Billboard)	22
Philippines (Philippines Hot 100)	64
South Korea (Circle)	1
Taiwan (Billboard)	2

=== Monthly charts ===
Monthly chart performance
Chart (2024)	Position
South Korea (Circle)	2

=== Year-end charts ===
Year-end chart performance
Chart	Year	Position
South Korea (Circle)	2024	30
South Korea (Circle)	2025	76
