= Room No.7 =

- Theatrical release poster
- Directed by: Lee Yong-seung
- Screenplay by: Lee Yong-seung
- Starring: Shin Ha-kyun; Doh Kyung-soo
- Production company: Myung Films
- Distributed by: Lotte Entertainment
- Release dates: July 13, 2017 (BiFan); November 15, 2017 (South Korea)
- Running time: 94 minutes
- Country: South Korea
- Language: Korean
- Box office: US$2.4 million

Room No.7 (Korean: 7호실; RR: 7hosil) is a 2017 South Korean comedy thriller film starring Shin Ha-kyun and Doh Kyung-soo.

== Plot ==
Story of a corpse being found in a DVD room by Tae-jung (Doh Kyung-soo), a part-timer who works at the store and the owner of the store Doo-shik (Shin Ha-kyun) who is trying to sell the room to keep the secret hidden.

== Cast ==
=== Main ===
- Shin Ha-kyun as Doo-sik

An owner of a DVD Store who plans to sell it fast

- Doh Kyung-soo as Tae-jung

A part-time employee at the DVD Store trying to pay off his student debts

=== Supporting ===
- Kim Dong-young as Han-wook
- Kim Jong-soo as Real estate agent
- Kim Jong-goo as Vice-principal
- Park Soo-young as Superintendent
- Jeon Seok-ho as Detective Woo
- Hwang Jung-min as Doo-shik's elder sister
- Jung Seung-gil as Doo-shik's brother-in-law
- Jung Hee-tae as Pawn shop employee
- Kim Do-yoon as Tattoo man
- Woo Ji-hyun as Cafe manager
- Kim Ji-young as Tree-lined street woman

=== Cameo appearance ===
- Kim Tae-han as Garosu-gil street man
- Choi Moo-sung as Used-cars dealership owner

== Production ==
The film is the second film of the filmmaker Lee Yong-seung, who is known for his first film 10 Minutes which was a big hit and earned several prizes at the Busan International Film Festival.

First script reading took place on December 22, 2016. Filming began on January 2, 2017 and ended on February 23.

== Release ==
Room No.7 unveiled at the Cannes Film Festival on May 18, 2017 and had its world premiere at the 21st Bucheon International Fantastic Film Festival on July 13, 2017.

The film was released in local cinemas on November 15, 2017 and debuted at No. 1 among the Korean films.
