= 16 Fantasy =

- Digital cover

EP by Lee Young-ji
- Released: June 21, 2024
- Recorded: 2024
- Studios: In Grid (Seoul); VTG (Seoul)
- Genres: Hip hop; R&B
- Length: 16:18
- Languages: Korean; English
- Label: Mainstream
- Producers: Monocat; No2zcat; Peejay

Singles from 16 Fantasy
- 1. "Small Girl" Released: June 21, 2024; 2. "Unknown Guy" Released: July 5, 2024

16 Fantasy is the debut EP by South Korean rapper Lee Young-ji. It was released by Mainstream and distributed by Kakao Entertainment on June 21, 2024. Lee is credited as the lyricist across the six tracks featured on the EP. The EP is supported by the double title tracks "Small Girl" and "Unknown Guy" as the single of the EP, with the former released on the same day as the EP and the latter on July 5. The EP peaked at number 21 domestically on the Circle Album Chart.

== Background ==
Prior to the release of 16 Fantasy, Lee debuted in the South Korean hip-hop scene with the single "Dark Room" which was released back in 2019. She quickly rose to fame after participating in and winning hip-hop audition programs, including High School Rapper 3 and Show Me the Money 11.

On June 10, 2024, Lee posted a picture of her wearing a white t-shirt and holding a balloon. She revealed the name of the EP, 16 Fantasy and wrote "The album is coming out on June 21, please listen to me, I'm begging you like this." The rapper also confirmed that all the songs she performed in a previous fan meeting are featured on the EP. On June 14, she posted a photo of her and singer Doh Kyung-soo sitting on the back of the car and announcing that he is the singer featured on the title track, "Small Girl". On June 19, Lee announced that she will hold a free "busking" concert at Ttukseom Hangang Park on June 20, so that the fans from South Korea can hear the songs live ahead of the release before she heads to Taipei. She also confirmed that the album will have a physical version. On the same day, she later uploaded a photo of her getting a tattoo with the names of the tracks on the EP.

On June 21, the EP was released digitally worldwide on various music streaming platforms.

== Composition ==
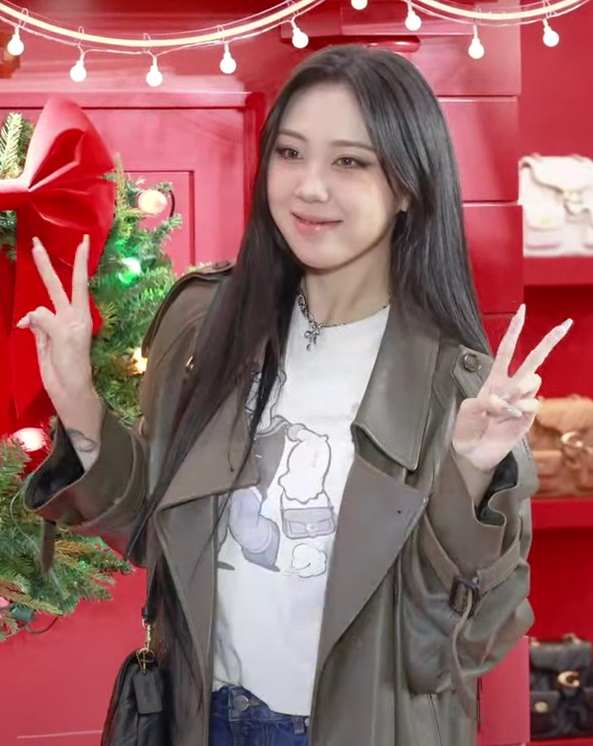
Lee penned the lyrics on all the six songs featured on the EP.

16 Fantasy featured six tracks where Lee participated in the writing process. The name of the EP was taken from the rapper's bravery when she was 16 years old, stating that "Just like when I was 16 years old, I was braver than anybody else." The EP is categorized under hip hop and R&B genres.

The EP begins with "16 (Intro)" where Lee introduces herself as the "170 and 5-centimeter Peter Pan and a sixteen-year-old with a grown-up head" narrator. Title track "Small Girl" narrates Lee's experience dating boyfriends who were around the same height or a little shorter than her. Heavily written in English, the song highlights her admiration and envy of shorter girls whilst discussing her inability to conform to societal standards. She wrote the song right away after being annoyed when a little girl asked her how she was doing. Music critic Jung Min-jae gave the song a positive review, "This song comforts people and giving them a sense of solidarity. She did a good job of telling her story."

Contrary to the upbeat nature of "Small Girl", "Unknown Guy" took a melancholic turn. Based on the real story, Lee grew up with her mother and grandmother after her father left their home. Although not explicitly explaining when her father left, it was long enough that she no longer has memories of him.

== Promotion ==
The first promotion of the EP began with the upload of the "Small Girl" music video teaser on June 17 on Lee's YouTube channel, showing her and Doh singing the chorus of the song. The music video of "Small Girl" was released on June 21, and quickly surpassed two million views by the following day. The music video received backlash from some fans as it featured a cheek kissing scene between the rapper and the singer. During an interview with Na Yeong-seok, Lee clarified that the scene was discussed beforehand despite some thought it was improvised. She recounted that she never met Doh previously and the director seized the opportunity to capture the "awkwardness" between the pair. Following the backlash after the release, the director of the music video stated that it was okay to scrap the scene since the rapper "wished to not be hated and meet an untimely death", although ultimately the video remained aired as it was.

The music video for "Unknown Guy" was released on July 5, showing Lee in a phone booth in the middle of the night.

=== Live performance ===
Lee performed "Intro", "Small Girl", and "Tell Me!" at SBS' Gayo Daejeon Summer Blue Carpet Event at Incheon on July 21.

=== Tour ===
Shortly after the release of 16 Fantasy, Lee would embark on a world tour called All or Nothing to promote the EP.

== Critical reception ==
Music critic Kim Do-heon gave the EP a mixed review noting that "The rapper seems to prefer delivering her message comfortably and honestly rather than direct approach with hardcore hip-hop." Nonetheless, the critic backed the rapper to continue growing and showcase her talent.

== Commercial performance ==
16 Fantasy debuted at number 60 on Circle Chart's Album Chart for week 29 of 2024. The EP then peaked on number 21 for week 33 with a cumulative sale over 7,000 copies.

== Track listing ==
All lyrics are written by Lee Young-ji, except where noted.

16 Fantasy track listing
| No. | Title | Lyrics | Music | Arrangement | Length |
|---|---|---|---|---|---|
| 1. | "16 (Intro)" | Lee Young-ji; Naji; Fisherman | Peejay | Peejay | 1:15 |
| 2. | "My Cat" | | Lee; Harry Bauer Rodrigues; Jambino; Toigo | Baauer | 2:15 |
| 3. | "Small Girl" (featuring Doh Kyung-soo) | | Peejay; Lee | Peejay | 3:10 |
| 4. | "ADHD" (featuring Jambino) | Lee; Jambino | Peejay; Lee; Jambino | Peejay | 3:14 |
| 5. | "Unknown Guy" (모르는 아저씨) | | Lee; Monocat | Monocat | 3:08 |
| 6. | "Tell Me!" | | No2zcat; Lee | No2zcat; Iryo | 3:16 |
| Total length: | | | | | 16:18 |

== Credits ==
Credits for 16 Fantasy are adapted from the album's liner notes and Melon.

Musicians

- Lee Young-ji – vocals, lyrics, composition (2, 3, 4, 5, 6), background vocals (6)
- Peejay – producer (3, 4), composition and arrangement (1, 3, 4), drum (1, 3, 4), bass (4), keyboard and piano (3, 4), synthesizer (1, 3)
- Monocat – producer, composition, arrangement, bass, brass, drum, guitar, keyboard, synthesizer (5)
- No2zcat – producer, composition, arrangement, bass, drum, synthesizer (6)
- Baauer – composition, arrangement (2)
- Iryo – arrangement, synth (6)
- Jambino – vocals and lyrics (4), composition (2, 4)
- Naji – lyrics (1)
- Fisherman – lyrics (1)
- Toigo – composition (2)
- Koo Young-jun – guitar (3, 4)
- Kim Nog-cha – guitar (6)
- Ikbbo – bass (3)
- Park Sung-chan – drum (6)
- Une – background vocals (6)
- Doh Kyung-soo – vocals (3)

Technical personnel

- MoZ – recording (1, 2, 3, 4, 5, 6), mixing (1, 2, 5, 6)
- Jung Eun-kyung – recording (3)
- Kwon Nam-woo – mastering
- Ko Hyun-jung – mixing (3, 4)
  - Ji Min-woo – mixing assistant (3, 4)
  - Kim Joon-young – mixing assistant (3, 4)

Studios

- VTG Studio – recording, mixing
- Kokosound Studio – mixing (3, 4)
- Ingrid Studio – recording (3)
- 821sound – mastering

== Chart ==
=== Weekly charts ===
Weekly chart performance for 16 Fantasy
| Chart (2024) | Peak position |
|---|---|
| Japanese Download Albums (Billboard Japan) | 50 |
| South Korean Albums (Circle) | 21 |

=== Monthly charts ===
Monthly chart performance for 16 Fantasy
| Chart (2024) | Position |
|---|---|
| South Korean Albums (Circle) | 99 |

== Release history ==
Release history for 16 Fantasy
| Region | Date | Format | Version | Label | Ref |
|---|---|---|---|---|---|
| Various | June 21, 2024 | Digital download; streaming | Digital | Mainstream | |
| South Korea | July 30, 2024 | CD | Jewel; Photobook | Mainstream | |
