= Expectation (EP) =

- Digital cover

EP by D.O.
- Released: September 18, 2023
- Recorded: 2023
- Studio: SM Big Shot (Seoul); SM Blue Cup (Seoul); SM Blue Ocean (Seoul); SM Starlight (Seoul); SM Yellow Tail (Seoul)
- Genre: Acoustic pop; folk-pop; R&B
- Length: 20:54
- Language: Korean
- Label: SM; Kakao
- Producer: Haj; Bram Inscore; LDN Noise; Ryan S. Jhun; Sam Klempner; Kristoffer Tømmerbakke; Aaron Wagner

D.O. chronology
Empathy (2021)	Expectation (2023)	Blossom (2024)

Singles from Expectation
- 1. "I Do" Released: September 8, 2023; 2. "Somebody" Released: September 18, 2023

Music video
- "Somebody" on YouTube

Professional ratings
Review scores
Source	Rating
NME	4/5 stars

Expectation (Korean: 기대; RR: Gidae) is the second extended play by South Korean singer and actor D.O.. It was released on September 18, 2023, by SM Entertainment and distributed by Kakao Entertainment. The album features seven tracks, including the lead single, "Somebody".

== Background ==
On September 1, 2023, D.O. announced his second comeback following Empathy two years ago. Along with the announcement, he also released a teaser photo.

On September 8, D.O. released a pre-release single, "I Do". Simultaneously, the music video is uploaded to SM Entertainment's YouTube channel. The music video is said to be the continuation of D.O.'s previous release, "That's Okay" from 2019.

== Composition ==
Expectation features seven tracks. Similar to its predecessor, it is based on acoustic pop, R&B, and folk-pop. The album has one bonus track, an acoustic version of "Lost".

Rolling Stone India praised the singer's vocal presentation skills on lead single "Somebody", describing it "smooth, soulful, and satisfying".

== Accolades ==
Billboard ranked the album in 18th place for their 2023 edition of the "25 Best K-pop Albums".

== Commercial performance ==
According to Circle Chart, the EP debuted in third place with over 85,000 sold copies within its first week of release.

== Track listing ==
Expectation track listing
No.	Title	Lyrics	Music	Arrangement	Length
1.	"Somebody"	Kang Eun-jeong	Aaron Wagner; Levi Hummon; Drew Schueler	Aaron Wagner	2:38
2.	"Wonder" (기적; Gijeok; 'Miracle')	Park Tae-won	LDN Noise; Shorelle; ADN Lewis	LDN Noise	2:56
3.	"I Do" (별 떨어진다; Byeol tteoreojinda; 'Stars fall')	Song U	Ryan S. Jhun; Kristoffer Tømmerbakke; Peder Elias; Jeon Myung-hoon; Park Min-soo	Ryan S. Jhun; Kristoffer Tømmerbakke	2:43
4.	"Lost"	Lee Hyoung-joo	James Hajigeorgiou; Kaci Brown; Sam Gray; Jimmy Mowery; Brian Craddock; Josh Paul; Ryan S. Jhun	James Hajigeorgiou; Ryan S. Jhun	3:08
5.	"Ordinary Days" (내일의 우리; Naeirui uri; 'Us tomorrow')	Lee Seu-ran	Bram Inscore; Thomas Higham; Ben Fletcher; Andrea Rosario; Alma Guðmundsdóttir	Bram Inscore	3:06
6.	"The View"	Mola	Zac Poor; Jack Gray; Sam Klempner; Hayley Warner	Sam Klempner	3:14
7.	"Lost" (acoustic version)	Lee Hyoung-joo	James Hajigeorgiou; Kaci Brown, Sam Gray; Jimmy Mowery; Brian Craddock; Josh Paul; Ryan S. Jhun	Ryan S. Jhun; Sam Gray	3:07
Total length:					20:54

== Charts ==
=== Weekly charts ===
Weekly chart performance for Expectation
Chart (2023)	Peak position
Japanese Albums (Oricon)	8
Japanese Combined Albums (Oricon)	11
Japanese Hot Albums (Billboard)	7
South Korean Albums (Circle)	3

=== Monthly charts ===
Monthly chart performance for Expectation
Chart (2023)	Position
Japanese Albums (Oricon)	36
South Korean Albums (Circle)	7

== Release history ==
Release history for Expectation
Region	Date	Format	Label
South Korea	September 18, 2023	CD	SM; Kakao
Various	September 18, 2023	Digital download; streaming	SM
