= Bliss (Doh Kyung-soo album) =

Studio album by Doh Kyung-soo
- Released: July 7, 2025
- Recorded: 2025
- Genres: K-pop; R&B
- Length: 26:52
- Language: Korean
- Labels: Company SooSoo; Dreamus

Doh Kyung-soo chronology
Blossom (2024)	Bliss (2025)	Dopamine (2026)

Singles from Bliss
- 1. "Sing Along!" Released: July 7, 2025

Bliss is the first studio album by South Korean singer and actor Doh Kyung-soo. The album was released on July 7, 2025, under Company SooSoo and it was distributed by Dreamus. The album consists of ten tracks including the lead single "Sing Along!". According to South Korean music data provider Circle Chart, the album sold 79,106 copies within the first week of its release.

== Track listing ==
Bliss track listing
No.	Title	Lyrics	Music	Arrangement	Length
1.	"Nobody Knows It"	Park Rang	Aaron Fredrick Mitchell; Jack Samson; Jacob Attwooll	Attwooll	2:51
2.	"Do You Remember?" (놀이터; Noriteo; 'Playground')	Lee Eun-hwa	Nicki Adamsson; Samson; Kate Morgan; TMM	Adamsson	2:57
3.	"Fit"	Penomeco; Damian	Shae Jacobs; Mustapha LeBeau; Shakka; TMM	Jacobs; LeBeau	2:35
4.	"Sing Along!"	Zico; Doh Kyung-soo	Zico; No Identity	Zico; No Identity	2:36
5.	"5 Minutes" (틈; Teum; 'Break')	Si Ah	Dino Medanhodzic; Sam Merrifield; Jordan Shaw; 153/Joombas	Medanhodzic	2:38
6.	"I'll Be There" (내일을 너에게; Naeireul neoege; 'Tomorrow to You')	Pumpkin	Sam Yun; Vincent J. van den Ende; Faangs; TMM	Yun; Avendon	2:36
7.	"Draw My Path)" (나답게; Nadapge; 'Like Me')	AK	Rollo; Kristoffer Fogelmark; Hank Solo	Solo	2:34
8.	"Where You Were" (기억의 온기; Gieogui ongi; 'Warmth of a Memory')	Song U	Joe Harvey; Jack Harvey; TMM	JXJ	2:41
9.	"In Another Life" (우리; Uri; 'Us')	Park Tae-won	Josh McClelland; Henry Moodie; Andy Eberhart	Andysocialclub	2:56
10.	"Love to Love U" (사랑한다는 건; Saranghandaneun geon; 'To Love Is')	Bay	Thomas Daniel; Mike Robinson	Robinson	2:27
Total length:					26:52

== Charts ==
=== Weekly charts ===
Weekly chart performance for Bliss
Chart (2025)	Peak position
South Korean Albums (Circle)	4

=== Monthly charts ===
Monthly chart performance for Bliss
Chart (2025)	Position
South Korean Albums (Circle)	15

== Release history ==
Release history for Bliss
Region	Date	Format	Label
South Korea	July 7, 2025	CD	Company SooSoo; Dreamus
Various	July 7, 2025	Digital download; streaming	Company SooSoo; Dreamus
