= Tell Me (What Is Love) =

Single by D.O. and Yoo Young-jin

from the album SM Station Season 1
- Language: Korean
- Released: February 19, 2016
- Recorded: 2015
- Studio: SM Booming System (Seoul)
- Genre: R&B
- Length: 4:42
- Label: SM; KT
- Composer: Yoo Young-jin
- Lyricist: Yoo Young-jin
- Producer: Yoo Young-jin

D.O. singles chronology
"Scream" (2014)	"Tell Me (What Is Love)" (2016)	"Don't Worry" (2016)

SM Station singles chronology
"Rain" (2016)	"Tell Me (What Is Love)" (2016)	"Because of You" (2016)

Music video
- "Tell Me (What Is Love) (Epilogue)" on YouTube

"Tell Me (What Is Love)" is a song recorded by South Korean singer D.O. from boy band Exo and SM Entertainment's in-house record producer, Yoo Young-jin. It was released on February 19, 2016, by SM Entertainment and KT Music, as the second song of the SM Station digital project.

It would later be featured in the compilation album, SM Station Season 1 which was released the following year.

== Background ==
On January 27, 2016, SM Entertainment founder Lee Soo-man established the SM Station digital music project. The project is scheduled to run for 52 weeks a year and features collaborations between SM artists with various artists, producers, and other composers. On February 3, Girls' Generation's Taeyeon was the first to debut on this digital project through her release of jazz song, "Rain".

On February 17, SM announced that D.O. will be the second artist in line to release an SM Station material alongside SM's in-house record producer, Yoo Young-jin for "Tell Me (What Is Love)".

The song was released digitally through streaming platforms on the midnight of February 19.

== Composition ==
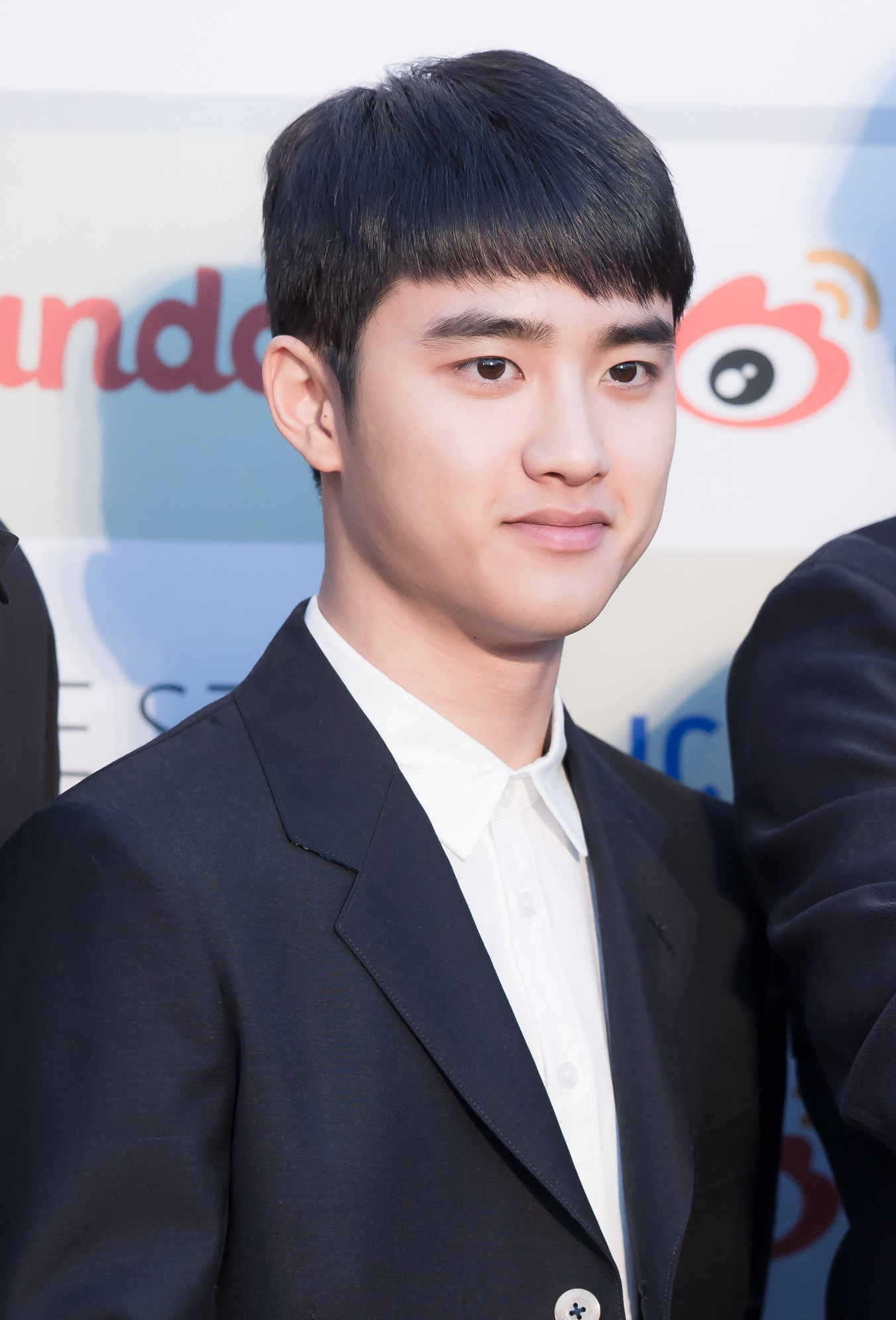
D.O. (pictured in 2016) became the second artist to release an SM Station single

"Tell Me (What Is Love)" is an emotional R&B song. The lyrics was written entirely by Yoo and narrates a monologue from a stupid man who had just realized his love after his lover left him. The song is considered as the follow-up to Exo's pre-debut single "What Is Love" which was originally released in 2012 and featured on their debut EP.

Yoo composed and arranged the song in the key of C Minor, with the tempo of 120 beats per minute.

== Commercial performance ==
The song achieved success domestically by placing at No. 12 in the Gaon Chart and in the United States where it ranked second in the World Digital Song Sales chart.

== Charts ==
Chart performance for "Tell Me (What Is Love)"
Chart (2016)	Peak position
South Korea (Gaon)	12
US World Digital Song Sales (Billboard)	2

== Credits and personnel ==
Credits adapted from the album's liner notes.

Studio

- SM Booming System – recording, mixing
- Sonic Korea – mastering

Personnel

- SM Entertainment – executive producer
- Lee Soo-man – producer
- D.O. – vocals
- Yoo Young-jin – producer, vocals, lyrics, composition, arrangement, vocal directing, background vocals, recording, mixing
- Sam Lee – guitar
- Jeon Hoon – mastering

== Release history ==
Release history for "Tell Me (What Is Love)"
Region	Date	Format	Label
Various	February 19, 2016	Digital download; streaming	SM; KT
