= Rose (D.O. song) =

Single by D.O.

from the EP Empathy
- Language: Korean; English
- Released: July 26, 2021
- Recorded: 2021
- Studio: SM Yellow Tail (Seoul)
- Genre: Easy listening; folk-pop
- Length: 2:33
- Label: SM; Dreamus
- Composers: Emanuel Abrahamsson; Benjamin Ingrosso; Axel Ehnström
- Lyricists: Emanuel Abrahamsson; Benjamin Ingrosso; Axel Ehnström; Doh Kyung-soo
- Producer: Emanuel Abrahamsson

D.O. singles chronology
"That's Okay" (2019)	"Rose" (2021)	"I Do" (2022)

Music video
- "Rose" on YouTube

"Rose" is a song recorded in both Korean and English by South Korean singer-actor, D.O. that was released on July 26, 2021, by SM Entertainment and distributed by Dreamus. The Korean version served as the lead single of D.O.'s debut EP, Empathy, while the English version is included as the bonus track.

== Background ==
D.O. previously released digital single "That's Okay" on July 1, 2019, coinciding with the day he entered his military enlistment. He was discharged on January 25, 2021, after taking his final military vacation leave in December 2020, without having to return to his military base due to the COVID-19 protocols.

D.O. returned to Exo for their seventh EP, Don't Fight the Feeling that was released on June 7. Later that month, SM announced that D.O. will release his first EP Empathy on July 26, with pre-orders commencing on July 1.

"Rose" was announced as the lead single of the EP on July 15, with D.O. himself reported to be involved in the songwriting process. The teaser video for the song's music video was released on July 23.

The song was released alongside its EP on July 26.

== Composition ==
Produced by Emanuel Abrahamsson, "Rose" is an "easy listening folk-pop song with cheerful sound of acoustic guitar. Billboard labeled the song as "breezy." The lyrics were originally penned by Abrahamsson, Benjamin Ingrosso, and Axel Ehnström in English before D.O. translated the song into Korean, depicting a love story.

Lasting at two minutes and thirty-three seconds, the song was composed by Abrahamsson, Ingrosso, and Ehnström in the key of C major, and arranged by Abrahamsson with the tempo of 75 beats per minute.

D.O. recorded the English version of the song because the guide language of the song was in English, but he enjoyed the lyrics and the feel of the music so much and ended up recording the song in both Korean and English.

== Music video ==
The music video was released on July 26, showing D.O. avoiding disasters while enjoying a sunny day in the neighborhood.

== Commercial performance ==
"Rose" peaked domestically on the Gaon Digital Chart and the K-pop Hot 100 charts at numbers 33 and 91 respectively. Overseas, it peaked at number 16 in the World Digital Song Sales chart.

== Charts ==
=== Weekly charts ===
Chart performance for "Rose"
Chart (2021)	Peak position
South Korea (Gaon)	33
South Korea (K-pop Hot 100) (Billboard)	91
US World Digital Song Sales (Billboard)	16

== Accolades ==
Year-end lists
Publisher	Year	Listicle	Placement	Ref.
NME	2021	"The 25 best K-pop songs of 2021"	16th	
The Philippine Star	2021	"21 K-pop title tracks that defined 2021"	16th	

Music show awards
Song	Program	Date	Rank	Ref.
"Rose"	Music Bank (KBS)	August 6, 2021	1	

== Credits and personnel ==
Credits adapted from the EP's liner notes.

Studio

- SM Yellow Tail Studio – recording, digital editing
- SM Big Shot Studio – digital editing, engineered for mix
- SM Blue Ocean Studio – mixing
- 821 Sound Mastering – mastering

Personnel

- SM Entertainment – executive producer
- Lee Soo-man – producer
- Yoo Young-jin – music and sound supervisor
- Emannuel Abrahamsson – producer, composition, English lyrics, arrangement
- Benjamin Ingrosso – composition, English lyrics
- Axel Ehnström – composition, English lyrics
- Emily Yeonseo Kim – vocal direction
- Doh Kyung-soo – vocals, Korean lyrics
- Noh Min-ji – recording, digital audio editing
- Lee Min-gyu – digital audio editing, engineered for mix, mixing
- Kim Chul-soon – mixing
- Kwon Nam-woo – mastering

== Release history ==
Release history for "Rose"
Region	Date	Format	Label
South Korea	July 26, 2021	Digital download; streaming	SM; Dreamus
Various	July 26, 2021	Digital download; streaming	SM
