= Lee Young-ji =

South Korean rapper (born 2002)

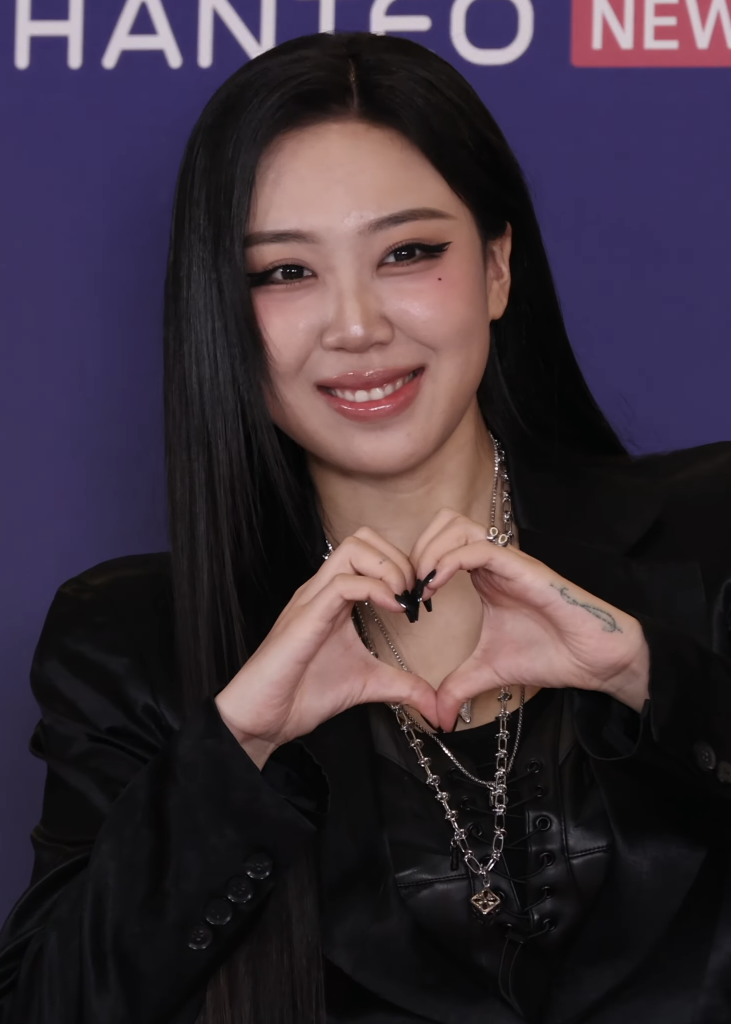
- Lee in February 2026

Background information
- Born: September 10, 2002 (age 24); Seoul, South Korea
- Genres: K-rap; hip-hop
- Occupation: Rapper
- Instrument: Vocals
- Years active: 2019–present
- Label: Mainstream
- Website: Official website

Korean name
- Hangul: 이영지
- RR: I Yeongji
- MR: I Yŏngji

Lee Young-ji (Korean: 이영지; born September 10, 2002) is a South Korean rapper. She is the winner of High School Rapper 3 and Show Me the Money 11 as well as the host of the web talk show Not Much Prepared. She released her first extended play 16 Fantasy on June 21, 2024.

== Early life ==
Born and raised in Sinjeong-dong, Yangcheon District, Seoul, South Korea, Lee lived with her grandmother and mother for a long time after her father left home.

== Other ventures ==
=== Endorsements ===
In March 2025, Lee was selected as an advertising model for Binggrae's unsweetened banana-flavored milk. In April, Lee became the global ambassador of Dermo Cosmetics brand Dr.G.

=== Philanthropy ===
On August 11, 2022, Lee donated ₩10 million (c. $7,000) to help those affected by the 2022 South Korea floods through the Hope Bridge Korea Disaster Relief Association.

In March 2025, Lee donated ₩100 million through the Korean Red Cross to help with recovery efforts from wildfires that have occurred in the Ulsan, Gyeongbuk, and Gyeongnam regions.

In February 2026, Lee donated ₩300 million to the Seoul Children's Hospital, Asan Medical Center Children's Hospital, and the Korea Childhood Leukemia Foundation, through the game Cops and Robbers alongside her fans and the game's team.

On September 5, 2026, Lee donated ₩50 million to the Hope Bridge Korea Disaster Relief Association for flood recovery efforts in southern South Korea, including Geoje.

== Discography ==
=== Extended plays ===
Title	EP details	Peak chart positions	Sales
Title	EP details	KOR	Sales
16 Fantasy	Released: June 21, 2024; Label: Mainstream, Kakao Entertainment; Format: CD, digital download, streaming	21	KOR: 13,653

=== Singles ===
==== As lead artist ====
Title	Year	Peak chart positions							Album
Title	Year	KOR Circle	KOR Songs (Note: Includes the Billboard K-pop Hot 100 (defunct as of 2022), and South Korea Songs (part of Billboard's Hits of the World (2022 onwards)).)	HK	MLY	PHL	TWN	WW	Album
"Go High" (featuring Woo Won-jae, Changmo, and The Quiett)	2019	49	37	—	—	—	—	—	High School Rapper 3 Final
"Dark Room"	2019	—	—	—	—	—	—	—	Non-album singles
"New History" (featuring Young Kay)	2019	—	—	—	—	—	—	—	Non-album singles
"Walga"	2020	—	—	—	—	—	—	—	Non-album singles
"My Path"	2020	—	—	—	—	—	—	—	Non-album singles
"Just"	2020	—	—	—	—	—	—	—	Non-album singles
"I Am Lee Young Ji" (나는 이영지)	2020	—	—	—	—	—	—	—	Good Girl Episode 1
"Compromise"	2020	—	—	—	—	—	—	—	Non-album singles
"Day & Night" (낮 밤) (featuring Jay Park)	2021	56	27	—	—	—	—	—	Non-album singles
"Not Sorry (Prod. Slom)" (featuring pH-1)	2022	4	—	—	—	—	—	—	Show Me the Money 11 Episode 3
"Witch (Prod. Slom)" (featuring Jay Park and So!YoON!)	2022	60	—	—	—	—	—	—	Show Me the Money 11 Semi Final
"Hug (Prod. Slom)" (featuring Zion.T and Wonstein)	2022	136	—	—	—	—	—	—	Show Me the Money 11 Final
"Dejavu (Prod. Slom)" (featuring Jay Park)	2022	93	—	—	—	—	—	—	Show Me the Money 11 Final
"Small Girl" (featuring D.O.)	2024	1	1	15	22	94	2	38	16 Fantasy
"Unknown Guy" (모르는 아저씨)	2024	—	—	—	—	—	—	—	16 Fantasy
"Robot"	2026	—	—	—	—	—	—	—	Non-album single
"—" denotes releases that did not chart or were not released in that region.

==== As featured artist ====
Title	Year	Peak chart positions				Certifications	Album
Title	Year	KOR Circle	KOR Songs	JPN Hot	US World	Certifications	Album
"Home Work" (Young Kay featuring WH3N and Lee Young-ji)	2019	—	—	—	—		Time Lapse
"Let Me Love You" (Ha Min-woo featuring Lee Young-ji)	2019	—	—	—	—		The Tempo
"Lonely Behind" (Layone featuring Lee Young-ji and Basick)	2019	—	—	—	—		Foxiboy
"회상" (Earboy featuring Lee Young-ji and Bluedayboy)	2019	—	—	—	—		Reminisce (회상)
"Ah" (Rovxe & Goldash featuring Lee Young-ji)	2020	—	—	—	—		Blank
"Party" (LuVan featuring Lee Young-ji)	2020	—	—	—	—		Non-album single
"Holiday" (Twlv featuring Paloalto and Lee Young-ji)	2020	—	—	—	—		Antiformal
"Nuna Right Here" (Queen WA$ABII featuring Lee Young-ji)	2020	—	—	—	—		Non-album single
"Emo Hip-Hop" (Layone featuring EK, Lee Young-ji, and Basick)	2020	—	—	—	—		Itaewon
"Yay (Prod. Code Kunst)" Layone featuring Lee Young-ji, Jamie, and Paloalto)	2020	93	86	—	—		Show Me the Money 9 Final
"Empty Canvas" (Babylon featuring Layone and Lee Young-ji)	2021	—	—	—	—		Hardy
"Is This Bad B****** Number?" (Jeon So-yeon featuring Bibi and Lee Young-ji)	2021	— (Note: "Is This Bad B****** Number?" did not enter Gaon Digital Chart, but debuted and peaked at position 45 on component Download Chart.)	—	—	—		Windy
"Waka Boom" (My Way) (Hyolyn featuring Lee Young-ji)	2022	— (Note: "Waka Boom" (My Way)" did not enter the Gaon Digital Chart, but peaked at number 138 on the Gaon Download Chart.)	—	—	—		Ice
"Fighting" (파이팅 해야지) (BSS featuring Lee Young-ji)	2023	5	6	1	8	KMCA: Platinum (Note: Certification for streaming); RIAJ: Gold (Note: Certification for streaming)	Second Wind
"Fraktsiya" (프락치) (Mark featuring Lee Young-ji)	2024	54	—	—	—		Non-album single
"—" denotes releases that did not chart or were not released in that region.

==== Collaborations ====
Title	Year	Peak chart positions		Album
Title	Year	KOR Circle	KOR Songs	Album
"Orange Tree" (오렌지 나무) (with Pluma)	2019	39	92	High School Rapper 3 Part 2
"That's My Girl !!!" (댓츠마걸 !!!) (with Yunhway)	2020	—	—	Good Girl Episode 4
"I Do What I Want" (with Hyoyeon)	2020	—	—	Good Girl Final
"Freesia" (프리지아) (with Layone)	2022	102	84	Flower Language
"We" (Prod. Slom) (with Toigo, J'Kyun, Jambino, and Xinsayne featuring Jay Park)	2022	19	—	Show Me the Money 11 Episode 1
"Smoke" (Prod. Dynamicduo, Padi) (with Dynamicduo)	2023	2	4	Street Woman Fighter 2 Rank Mission
"Trouble" (with Christopher)	2024	192	—	Non-album single
"—" denotes releases that did not chart or were not released in that region.

=== Other charted songs ===
Title	Year	Peak chart positions	Album
Title	Year	KOR Circle	Album
"ADHD" (featuring Jambino)	2024	164	16 Fantasy

== Filmography ==
=== Television series ===
Year	Title	Role	Notes	Ref.
2020	Zombie Detective	Paramedic	Cameo (Episode 2)	

=== Television shows ===
Year	Title	Role	Notes	Ref.
2019	High School Rapper 3	Participant	Winner	
2020	Good Girl	Main Cast		
2021	Come Back Home	Host	With Yoo Jae-suk and Lee Yong-jin	
2022–2025	Earth Arcade	Cast member	Season 1–3	
2022–2023	Show Me the Money 11	Contestant	Winner	
2024–2025	The Seasons: Lee Young-ji's Rainbow	Host	Season 6	

=== Web shows ===
Year	Title	Role	Notes	Ref.
2021	Lee Young-ji's Hip Pladio	Host		
2022–2024; 2026	Not Much Prepared	Host	Seasons 1–4	

== Awards and nominations ==
Name of the award ceremony, year presented, category, nominee of the award, and the result of the nomination
Award ceremony	Year	Category	Nominee / Work	Result	Ref.
Asia Artist Awards	2023	Best Choice	Lee Young-ji	Won	
Asia Artist Awards	2026	Popularity Award – Solo (Female)	Lee Young-ji	Pending	
Brand Customer Loyalty Awards (Note: Co-organized by the Korean Customers Council and Brand Keys, this event recognizes the most influential brands in society and culture, as determined through consumer research.)	2021	Hot Icon	Lee Young-ji	Won	
Brand Customer Loyalty Awards	2025	Female Solo Singer	Lee Young-ji	Won	
Brand Customer Loyalty Awards	2025	Female Web Variety Show MC	Not Much Prepared	Won	
KBS Entertainment Awards	2021	Rookie Award in Show/Variety Category	Come Back Home	Nominated	
KBS Entertainment Awards	2024	Excellence Award in Show and Variety Category	The Seasons – Lee Young Ji's Rainbow	Won	
Korea PD Awards (Note: Hosted by the Korean Producers and Directors Association (KPDA), the annual Korea PD Awards honours broadcasting producers, officials, and entertainers who have contributed to the development of broadcasting culture and the implementation of free media. Up to 2007, the ceremony was known as the Korea Broadcast Producer Award. Winners are chosen by members of the association who vote for nominees in various fields of entertainment.)	2025	TV Host Award	The Seasons – Lee Young Ji's Rainbow	Won	
Korean Music Awards	2025	Best Pop Song	"Small Girl" (featuring D.O.)	Nominated	
MAMA Awards	2024	Fans' Choice Top 10 – Female	Lee Young-ji	Won	
MAMA Awards	2024	Fans' Choice of the Year	Lee Young-ji	Nominated	
MAMA Awards	2024	Olive Young K-Beauty Star in Music	Lee Young-ji	Won	
Melon Music Awards	2023	Best Solo (Female)	Lee Young-ji	Won	
Melon Music Awards	2024	Best Music Style	Lee Young-ji	Won	
Music Awards Japan	2026	Best Cross-Border Collaboration Song	"2" (with Gen Hoshino)	Won	
Seoul Music Awards	2025	Main Prize (Bonsang)	Lee Young-ji	Nominated	
Seoul Music Awards	2025	R&B / Hip-Hop Award	Lee Young-ji	Nominated	
Seoul Music Awards	2025	Popularity Award	Lee Young-ji	Nominated	
Seoul Music Awards	2025	K-Wave Special Award	Lee Young-ji	Nominated	
Seoul Music Awards	2025	K-pop World Choice – Solo	Lee Young-ji	Nominated	
