= Blossom (Doh Kyung-soo EP) =

- Digital and Mars version cover

EP by Doh Kyung-soo
- Released: May 7, 2024
- Recorded: 2024
- Studios: InGrid (Seoul); Klang (Seoul)
- Genres: K-pop; R&B
- Length: 18:00
- Languages: Korean; English
- Labels: Company SooSoo; Dreamus
- Producers: Simon Petrén; Peder Elias Eriksrud Kjørholt; M-Phazes; Aidan Rodriguez; JXJ; Sam Merrifield; Alex Wilke; Jason Strong

Doh Kyung-soo chronology
Expectation (2023)	Blossom (2024)	Bliss (2025)

Singles from Blossom
- 1. "Popcorn" Released: April 30, 2024; 2. "Mars" Released: May 7, 2024

Blossom (Korean: 성장; RR: Seongjang; lit. 'Growth') is the third EP by South Korean singer and actor Doh Kyung-soo. (Note: Credited as D.O. on most streaming platforms despite officially using his full name as his stage name after departing SM Entertainment.) The EP was released on May 7, 2024, under Doh's newly established agency Company SooSoo and was distributed by Dreamus. This was Doh's first release following his departure from SM Entertainment after 11 years with the agency.

Consisting of six tracks, the EP features two singles: the pre-release single "Popcorn" on April 30 and followed by its lead single "Mars" on May 7. According to South Korean music data provider Circle Chart, the EP sold over 120,000 copies within its first week of release.

== Background and release ==
South Korean singer Doh Kyung-soo has been a member of the South Korean boy band Exo since 2012 as one of their main vocalists. Nine years later he debuted as the group's sixth soloist through the release of Empathy on July 26, 2021. Doh returned to Exo for their seventh Korean-language album Exist that was released on July 10, 2023. Two months later, Doh released his second EP Expectation on September 18, which would turn out to be his last release with SM Entertainment.

On October 18, SM Entertainment announced that Doh would depart the agency in early November following the completion of his contract and establish a new agency to oversee the singer's acting and solo activities. Nonetheless, Doh will continue Exo group activities with SM. Later on, Doh and former SM director (and Doh's long-time manager) Nam Kyung-soo established a new agency called "Company SooSoo", named after their first names. The latter acts as the agency's CEO reportedly due to the singer's trust in his manager.

In January 2024, it was reported that Doh would have a solo comeback with his new agency scheduled to be released around April or May. On March 25, Company SooSoo announced that Doh would embark on his first Asia solo fan meet tour called "Bloom" from June 8 until August 31 starting with a double-header show in Seoul to kick off the tour. On April 8, Company SooSoo announced that Doh would release his third mini album titled Blossom on May 7 with "Mars" as the lead single and that pre-orders for the EP would begin that day. The teaser image for the mini album depicts the singer's full name as opposed to his previous stage name "D.O." The announcement was followed with the revelation of the EP's track list and comeback calendar on April 14 with teaser images uploaded on April 16 and 17. Pre-release single "Popcorn" was released digitally along with its music video on April 30.

The EP was released alongside the music video for the lead single "Mars" on May 7.

== Composition ==
"Most of the lyrics on the album are geared towards the theme of growth. I am hoping that the meaning of growth would be conveyed to the listeners, hence why I prepared by paying attention to the lyrics."

— Doh explaining the theme of the EP in an interview with Newsis.

Like Doh's previous releases, Blossom consisted of pop and R&B songs. Blossom, in its literal Korean meaning translates as "Growth". The album title refers to the theme of growth explored throughout the EP.

The EP opens with the lead single "Mars" which is described as a medium-tempo pop song with whimsical lyrics narrating the story of two lovers with different personalities with minimalist music arrangement. Debahsree Dutta of Rolling Stone India gave the song a positive review, calling it "pleasant and relatable". The second track "Simple Joys" features instrumentation from an ocarina, with its lyrics pertaining to the joy that comes from simple things. The third track is the pre-release single "Popcorn", a "bouncy" song with a whistle in the background. The lyrics liken the excitement of seeing a loved one to bursting popcorn. "Good Night" is a soothing lullaby-esque song that tells the listener to let go of their anxiety and worries. Penultimate track "My Dear" is an acoustic pop song that describes the preparations for a confession. The EP concludes with "About Time", a pop ballad song about true love and regret.

== Promotions ==
Doh promoted the EP by performing "Mars" and "Popcorn" at KBS on May 10. Doh appeared on IU's IU's Palette YouTube show on May 13 to promote the EP.

Doh embarked on his first solo Asia fan meet tour "Bloom" to promote the EP from June 8 until August 31.

== Track listing ==
Blossom track listing
No.	Title	Lyrics	Music	Arrangement	Length
1.	"Mars"	Park Tae-won	Simon Petrén; Peder Elias Eriksrud Kjørholt	Petrén; Kjørholt	3:08
2.	"Simple Joys" (우리가 몰랐던 것들; Uriga mollatdeon geotdeul; 'Things we didn't know')	Lee Seu-ran	Petrén; Kjørholt; Oiaisle	Petrén; Kjørholt	2:56
3.	"Popcorn"	Lee	Joe Harvey; Jack Harvey; Ryan Bickley; TMM	JXJ	3:02
4.	"Good Night" (오늘에게; Oneurege; 'To this day')	Danke (Lalala Studio)	Jordan Shaw; Sam Merrifield; TMM	Merrifield	3:03
5.	"My Dear" (매일의 고백; Maeirui gobaek; 'A daily confession')	Park Rang	Alex Wilke; Jason Strong; Armen Paul; Ricky Manning; TMM	Wilke; Strong	2:21
6.	"About Time" (어제의 너, 오늘의 나; Eojeui neo, oneurui na; 'Yesterday's you, today's me')	Jang Da-in	M-Phazes; Aidan Rodriguez; Chelsea Lena; Matt Hansen	M-Phazes; Rodriguez	3:36
Total length:					18:00

== Charts ==
=== Weekly charts ===
Weekly chart performance for Blossom
Chart (2024)	Peak position
Japanese Albums (Oricon)	26
Japanese Combined Albums (Oricon)	44
Japanese Hot Albums (Billboard Japan)	13
South Korean Albums (Circle)	2

=== Monthly charts ===
Monthly chart performance for Blossom
Chart (2024)	Position
South Korean Albums (Circle)	12

== Credits ==
Credits for Blossom are adapted from the album's liner notes, Melon, and Spotify.

Musicians

- Nam Kyung-soo – executive producer
- Doh Kyung-soo – vocals, background vocals
- Simon Petrén – producer (1, 2), composition and arrangement (1, 2)
- Peder Elias Eriksrud Kjørholt – producer (1, 2), composition and arrangement (1, 2)
- Park Tae-won – lyrics (1)
- Lee Seu-ran – lyrics (2, 3)
- Oiasle – composition (2)
- JXJ – producer, arrangement (3)
  - Jack Harvey – composition
  - Joe Harvey – composition
- Ryan Bickley – composition (3)
- TMM – composition (3, 4, 5)
- Sam Merrifield – producer, composition, arrangement (4)
- Danke (Lalala Studio) – lyrics (4)
- Jordan Shaw – composition (4)
- Alex Wilke – producer, composition, arrangement (5)
- Jason Strong – producer, composition, arrangement (5)
- Armen Paul – composition (5)
- Ricky Manning – composition (5)
- Park Rang – lyrics (5)
- M-Phazes – producer, composition, arrangement (6)
- Aidan Rodriguez – producer, composition, arrangement (6)
- Chelsea Lena – composition (6)
- Matt Hansen – composition (6)
- Jang Da-in – lyrics (6)

Technical personnel

- Seong Eun-kyung – recording, mixing
- Kwon Nam-woo – mastering

Studios

- InGrid Studio – recording
- Klang Studio – mixing
- 821 Sound – mastering

== Release history ==
Release history for Blossom
Region	Date	Format	Label
South Korea	May 7, 2024	CD	Company SooSoo; Dreamus
Various	May 7, 2024	Digital download; streaming	Company SooSoo; Dreamus
