= That's Okay =

Single by D.O.

from the album SM Station Season 3
- Language: Korean
- English title: "That's Okay"
- Released: July 1, 2019
- Recorded: 2019
- Studio: Jukjae (Seoul); SM LVYIN (Seoul)
- Genre: K-pop; R&B
- Length: 3:41
- Label: SM; Dreamus
- Composers: Coleridge Tillman; Robert Gerongco; Samuel Gerongco; Terence Lam
- Lyricists: Doh Kyung-soo; Jo Yoon-kyung; Hwang Yoo-bin

D.O. singles chronology
"That's Okay" (2019)	"Rose" (2021)

Music video
- "That's Okay" on YouTube

"That's Okay" (괜찮아도 괜찮아; Gwaenchanado gwaenchana) is a single by South Korean singer and actor D.O. It was released by SM Entertainment on July 1, 2019, through SM Station Season 3.

== Background and release ==
"That's Okay" is an R&B pop song featuring a warm acoustic guitar and a minimalist drum beat. The lyrics are about letting go of sad feelings and having hope, in order to achieve happiness.

One June 21, it was reported that D.O. would be releasing a song through SM Station Season 3. On June 26, it was revealed that D.O. participated in writing the lyrics of the song, and that it would be released on the day of his military enlistment, July 1, as a gift for his fans. On June 28, SM released an image teaser for the song.

== Music video ==
The music video is an animation that shows the story of a man finding comfort in reviving a dying potted cactus following the passing of his pet dog.

== Track listing ==
No.	Title	Lyrics	Music	Arrangement	Length
1.	"That's Okay" (괜찮아도 괜찮아)	D.O.; Jo Yoon-kyung; Hwang Yoo-bin	Coleridge Tillman; Robert Gerongco; Samuel Gerongco; Terence Lam	Tee for Kuya Productions; Jukjae	3:41
2.	"That's Okay" (instrumental)		Coleridge Tillman; Robert Gerongco; Samuel Gerongco; Terence Lam	Tee for Kuya Productions; Jukjae	3:41
Total length:					7:22

== Charts ==
Chart (2019)	Peak position
South Korea (Gaon)	12
South Korea (K-pop Hot 100)	19
US World Digital Songs (Billboard)	11

== Release history ==
Region	Date	Format	Label
South Korea	July 1, 2019	Digital download; streaming	SM; Dreamus
Various	July 1, 2019	Digital download; streaming	SM
