= Empathy (EP) =

- Digital and Photobook version cover

EP by D.O.
- Released: July 26, 2021
- Recorded: 2021
- Studios: SM Big Shot (Seoul); SM Blue Ocean (Seoul); SM LVYIN (Seoul); SM Yellow Tail (Seoul)
- Genres: Folk-pop; R&B; Latin pop
- Length: 24:28
- Languages: Korean; English; Spanish
- Labels: SM; Dreamus
- Producer: Lee Soo-man

D.O. chronology
Empathy (2021)	Expectation (2023)

Singles from Empathy
- 1. "Rose" Released: July 26, 2021

Professional ratings
Review scores
Source	Rating
The Line of Best Fit	9/10
NME	4/5 stars

Empathy (Korean: 공감; RR: Gonggam) is the debut extended play by South Korean singer and actor D.O. It was released on July 26, 2021, by SM Entertainment and distributed by Dreamus. The EP features eight tracks including the lead single, "Rose". The physical album comes in three versions: one photobook version and two digipack versions (Blue and Grey).

== Background ==
In late June 2021, SM Entertainment announced that D.O. would release his debut solo album on July 26. Pre orders became available on July 1.

== Composition ==
Empathy features eight tracks and is based on acoustic pop and R&B. The album has two bonus tracks: an English version of the title track "Rose", and a Spanish version of "It's Love", called "Si Fueras Mía". D.O. is credited as a writer for the title song "Rose", and "I'm Fine".

Billboard described the lead single "Rose" as "breezy folk-pop", and praised the artist's storytelling ability throughout the album. Speaking of the acoustic theme of the EP, D.O. commented that he liked the sounds of acoustic guitar and the comfort that it brings.

== Promotion ==
A highlight medley was released on July 23, which previewed the tracks on the album. The music video for the lead single "Rose" was released on July 26, the same day as the album.

== Track listing ==
Empathy track listing
No.	Title	Lyrics	Music	Arrangement	Length
1.	"Rose"	Emanuel Abrahamsson; Benjamin Ingrosso; Axel Ehnström; Do Kyung-soo	Emanuel Abrahamsson; Benjamin Ingrosso; Axel Ehnström	Emanuel Abrahamsson	2:33
2.	"I'm Gonna Love You" (featuring Wonstein)	danke (lalala studio); Wonstein	Jim Lavigne; Michael Matosic; Edwin Honoret; Larus "Leo" Arnason	Larus "Leo" Arnason	2:31
3.	"My Love"	Hwang Yu-bin	220; eaJ; Andreas Ringbloom	220	2:54
4.	"It's Love" (다시, 사랑이야; Dasi, sarangiya; 'Again, it's love')	Jo Yoon-kyung	Andreas Öberg; Danny Saucedo; Cindy Gomez; Maria Marcus	Andreas Öberg; Maria Marcus	3:57
5.	"Dad" (나의 아버지; Naui abeoji)	Jo Yoon-kyung	Dave Gibson; David Sneddon; Jon Hume; Tha Aristocrats	Tha Aristocrats	2:54
6.	"I'm Fine"	Hwang Yu-bin; 김토끼; Do Kyung-soo	Emile Ghantous; Josephine Carr; Celeste Williams; Lamont Pierre Heath	Emile Ghantous	3:09
7.	"Rose" (English version)	Emanuel Abrahamsson; Benjamin Ingrosso; Axel Ehnström	Emanuel Abrahamsson; Benjamin Ingrosso; Axel Ehnström	Emanuel Abrahamsson	2:33
8.	"Si Fueras Mía"	Andreas Öberg; Danny Saucedo	Andreas Öberg; Danny Saucedo; Cindy Gomez; Maria Marcus	Andreas Öberg; Maria Marcus	3:57
Total length:					24:28

== Charts ==
=== Weekly charts ===
Weekly chart performance for Empathy
Chart (2021)	Peak position
Japan Hot Albums (Billboard Japan)	10
Japanese Albums (Oricon)	4
South Korean Albums (Gaon)	1

=== Monthly charts ===
Monthly chart performance for Empathy
Chart (2021)	Position
South Korean Albums (Gaon)	2

=== Year-end charts ===
Year-end chart performance for Empathy
Chart (2021)	Position
South Korean Albums (Gaon)	36

== Sales ==
Region	Sales
China	84,115
Japan	26,590
South Korea	380,178

== Certifications ==
Certifications for Empathy
Region	Certification	Certified units/sales
South Korea (KMCA)	Platinum	250,000^{^}
^{^} Shipments figures based on certification alone.

== Accolades ==
=== Year-end lists ===
Year-end lists
Critic/Publication	Year	List	Work	Rank	Ref.
Harpers Bazaar	2021	Top-15-k-pop-albums-of-2021	"Empathy"	1	
NME	2021	The 25 best K-Pop songs of 2021	"Rose"	16	
Philstarlife	2021	Top-21-k-pop-b-side tracks-of-2021	"My Love"	1	
Philstarlife	2021	Top-15-k-pop-title tracks-of-2021	"Rose"	16	
K-Pop High India	2021	Top-10-k-pop-songs-of-2021	"Rose"	-	
The Daily Box	2021	The Ultimate-10-k-pop-songs-of-2021	"Si Fueras Mia"	-	

=== Music show awards ===
Music show awards
Song	Program	Date	Rank	Ref.
"Rose"	Music Bank (KBS)	August 6, 2021	1	

== Release history ==
Release history for Empathy
Region	Date	Format	Label
South Korea	July 26, 2021	CD	SM; Dreamus
Various	July 26, 2021	Digital download; streaming	SM
