= Doh Kyung-soo =

South Korean singer and actor (born 1993)

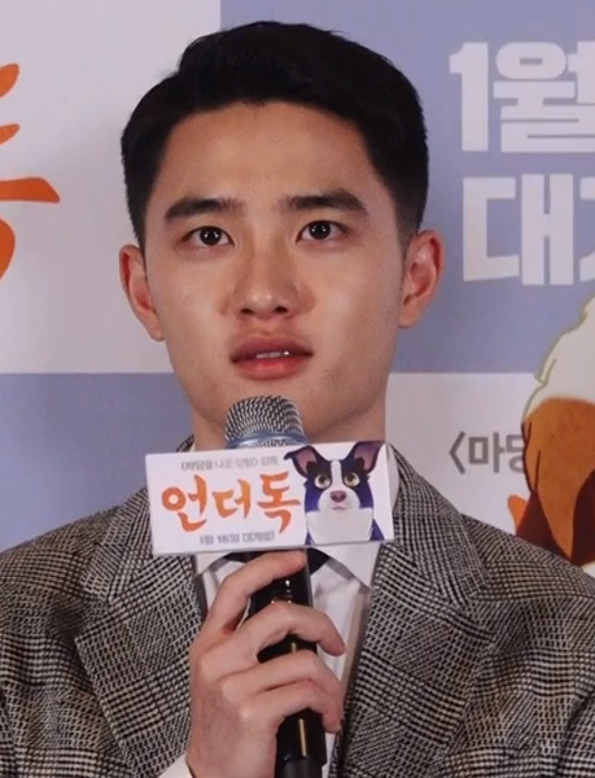
- Doh in 2019
- Born: January 12, 1993 (age 33); Seoul, South Korea
- Other name: D.O.
- Education: Kyung Hee Cyber University
- Occupations: Singer; actor
- Musical career
- Genres: K-pop; R&B; Folk-pop
- Instrument: Vocals
- Years active: 2012–present
- Labels: SM; Company SooSoo; Blitzway Entertainment
- Member of: Exo; Exo-K
- Formerly of: SM Town
- Website: Official website

Korean name
- Hangul: 도경수
- RR: Do Gyeongsu
- MR: To Kyŏngsu

Signature
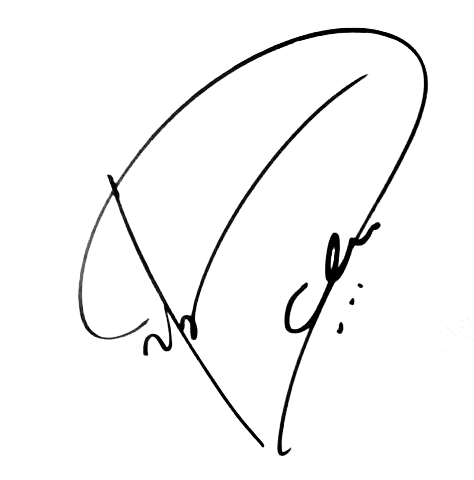

Doh Kyung-soo (Korean: 도경수; born January 12, 1993), also known as D.O. (디오), is a South Korean singer and actor. He is a member of the South Korean boy band Exo. He debuted as a soloist on July 26, 2021, with his first extended play (EP) Empathy. He has since released three more EPs, Expectation (2023), Blossom (2024), and Dopamine (2026), as well as a studio album, Bliss (2025).

As an actor, Doh has starred in various television dramas and movies such as It's Okay, That's Love (2014), My Annoying Brother (2016), Along with the Gods: The Two Worlds (2017), 100 Days My Prince (2018), Swing Kids (2018), Bad Prosecutor (2022), and The Manipulated (2025). In recognition of his acting, he was selected by the Korean Film Council as one of the 200 Korean actors that best represent the present and future of Korea's movie scene.

== Life and career ==
=== 1993–2015: Early life and career beginnings ===
Doh Kyung-soo was born on January 12, 1993, in Nonhyeon-dong of Gangnam District, Seoul, South Korea, and grew up in Ilsandong District of Goyang, Gyeonggi Province. He went to Goyang Poongsan Elementary School, Baekshin Middle School, and Baekseok High School. He has an older brother who is three years older than him. Doh began singing in primary school and was an avid participant in local singing competitions throughout his high school career. After winning one of the competitions, he was advised to audition for SM Entertainment. He performed Na Yoon-kwon's "Anticipation" and Brown Eyed Soul's "My Story" at his audition. Doh subsequently became a trainee during his last two years of high school.

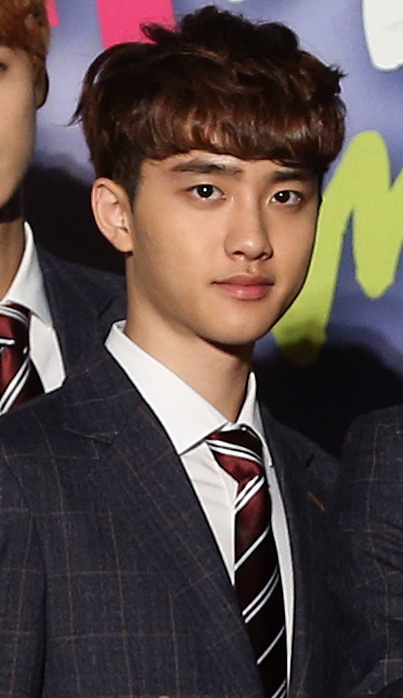
D.O. in October 2013

Doh was formally introduced under his stage name D.O. as the eighth member of Exo on January 30, 2012, with the release of the Korean version of the single "What Is Love", sung by him and Baekhyun. The group debuted on April 8 with the EP Mama. In July 2013, he was featured in the song "Goodbye Summer" from f(x)'s second studio album Pink Tape. In September 2014, Doh made his acting debut with a supporting role in the movie Cart, playing a high school student and son of a grocery store worker and union member (played by Yum Jung-ah). The movie premiered at the 2014 Toronto International Film Festival. He also released an original soundtrack titled "Crying Out" for the movie.

Later in 2014, Doh made his small screen debut playing a supporting role in the SBS drama It's Okay, That's Love, which starred Gong Hyo-jin and Zo In-sung. He was praised by film critic Heo Ji-woong for his performance in the series, and was later nominated for the Best New Actor award at the 51st Baeksang Arts Awards. In June 2015, Doh featured in KBS' drama Hello Monster, playing a psychopath. In November 2015, Doh was nominated for the Best Supporting Actor award at the 52nd Grand Bell Awards for his role as Tae-young in Cart.

=== 2016–2020: Lead roles, recognition and military service ===
In January 2016, Doh was announced as one of the cast of voice actors for the feature-length animated film Underdog, which premiered in 2019. He voiced Moongchi, a stray dog who is separated from his owner. In February 2016, he collaborated with Yoo Young-jin on a duet titled "Tell Me (What Is Love)" for SM Station Season 1. He had previously performed a short version of the song as a solo performance throughout Exo's first concert tour. Later in February, Doh starred as the male lead alongside actress Kim So-hyun in the romantic film Pure Love. In October 2016, Doh starred alongside Chae Seo-jin in the web drama Be Positive. The series became the most watched Korean web drama of all time. In November 2016, Doh starred alongside Jo Jung-suk and Park Shin-hye in the film My Annoying Brother, playing a national level Judo athlete. He and Jo also recorded the ending theme song, titled "Don't Worry" for the movie. Doh was awarded the Blue Dragon Film Awards Best New Actor award a year later for his performance in the film.

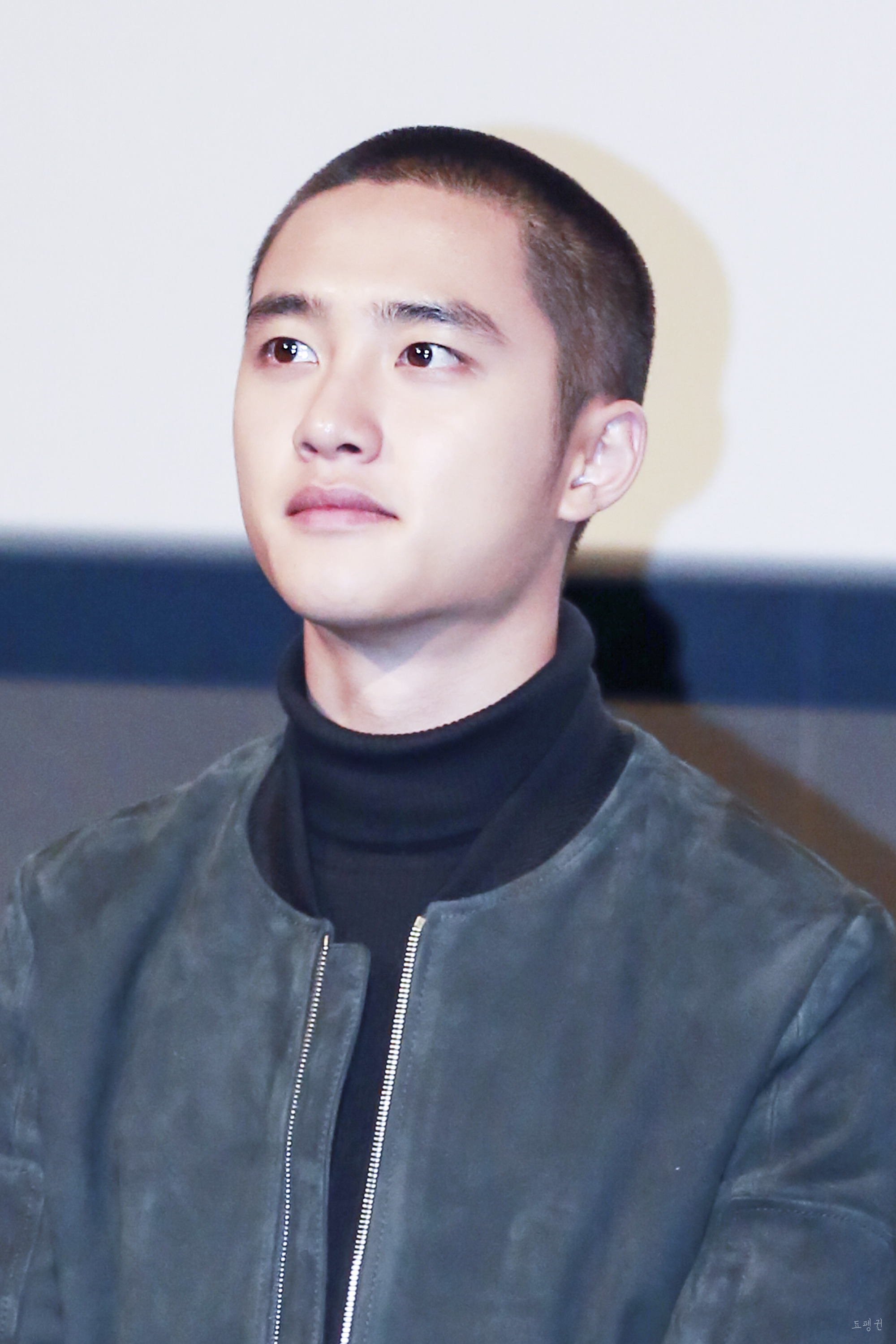
D.O. at a press conference for Room No.7 in November 2017

In 2017, Doh starred in the comedy thriller film Room No.7. The same year, he played a supporting role in Kim Yong-hwa's film Along with the Gods: The Two Worlds, a blockbuster adaptation of the webtoon of the same name, about a court in the afterlife where the deceased undergo multiple trials for 49 days. In December 2017, Doh attended the Macau International Film Festival alongside director Choi Dong-hoon as a Korean public relations ambassador. In 2018, Doh starred in Swing Kids, a film set in a prison camp in South Korea during the Korean War. He plays a North Korean soldier who falls in love with tap dancing in the midst of all the chaos. Later that year, he was cast in his first small-screen leading role, playing a crown prince in 100 Days My Prince. The series was a commercial success, becoming the fifth highest-rated Korean drama in cable television history and in 2020, became the first CJ ENM drama to be broadcast in Japan's public television channel, NHK General TV.

==== Military service ====
In May 2019, Doh was reported to be among the conscripted soldiers for July, to the surprise of many. Shortly after the news, he posted a handwritten letter on EXO's official fan club confirming and announcing his upcoming enlistment for South Korea's mandatory military service. He enlisted as an active duty soldier on July 1, 2019. On the same day, he released the single "That's Okay," a song that he co-wrote, through the SM Station project as a gift for his fans. After completing his training, he served at the Capital Mechanized Infantry Division (Fierce Tiger Division) as a food handler (kitchen police).

In 2020, Doh participated in the Taegeukgi (Korean Flag) Campaign for the 70th anniversary of Korean War and was cast in a commemorative rerun of the original military musical Return: The Promise of the Day, playing the role of young Seungho, marking it as his musical theater debut. A special run of the musical was broadcast live via Naver TV on June 10, 2020. Due to COVID-19 protocols, in-person performances were cancelled and shifted to online broadcast between September 24 to 26, 2020.

During his service, Doh also participated in Military Manpower Administration's "I Am Proud" campaign. He was also selected in the South Korea's Ministry of Justice awareness campaign against "Digital Sexual Exploitation".

After taking his final military vacation leave in December 2020 without returning to his base in compliance with the army's protocols regarding the COVID-19 pandemic, Doh was officially discharged on January 25, 2021.

=== 2021–present: Return to acting, solo debut and departure from SM Entertainment ===
In October 2020, prior his discharge, Doh was announced to be cast in Kim Yong-hwa's next film, The Moon, where he will play the lead role of Hwang Seon-woo, an astronaut left in space due to an unforeseen accident. Filming began on June 6, 2021, and concluded on October 12, 2021. The film was released in August 2023.

In February 2021, Doh was announced to have been cast as the male lead in Secret: Untold Melody, a South Korean remake of the 2007 Taiwanese film Secret by Jay Chou. In the film, he played Yu-jun, a piano prodigy who crosses paths with Won Jin-ah's character Jung-a. The filming began in November 2021 and wrapped in January 2022. The film was released on January 27, 2025. In March 2021, Doh was selected as one of the 200 actors for "The Actor is Present" campaign by the Korean Film Council (KOFIC) to represent the past and present of the Korean Cinema. His profile was unveiled in May 2021. On June 25, 2021, SM Entertainment announced that Doh would release his first solo album at the end of July 2021. His first EP Empathy was released on July 26, along with its lead single "Rose." Doh had participated in writing the lyrics for his lead single, "Rose" and "I'm Fine". The album topped the Gaon Album Chart.

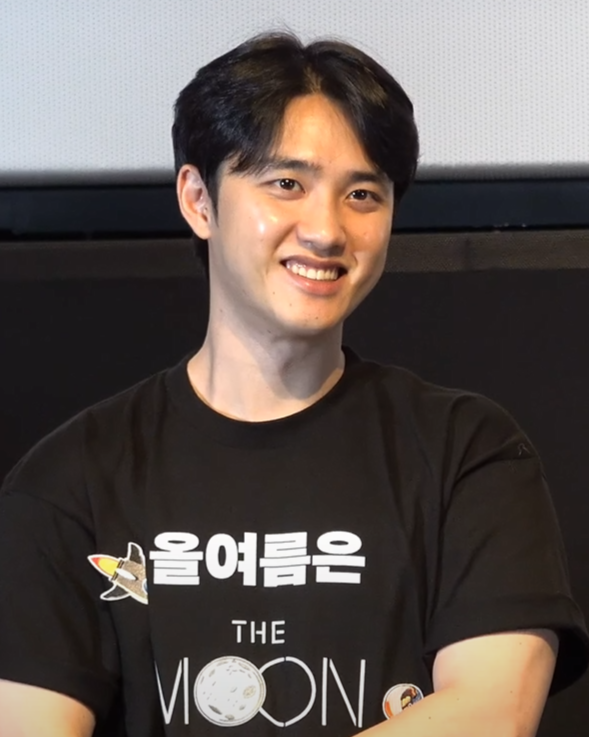
Doh at a stage greeting for The Moon in August 2023

In 2022, Doh was announced as the next actor to feature in the 2-episode travel show by Discovery Channel Korea, Off The Grid, where he took a 3 days, 2 nights solo roadtrip to Namhae and the southern side of South Korea. His episodes aired in May 2022. Doh made his return to the small screen with KBS2 drama series, Bad Prosecutor in October 2022, where he played the lead role of Jin Jung, a delinquent prosecutor who fights for justice. He earned Top Excellence Award (Actor) in the 2022 KBS Drama Award for his performance.

In 2023, Doh appeared in SBS's variety show, No Math School Trip by former director of Running Man, Choi Bo-pil, along with Zico, Crush, Choi Jung-hoon, Lee Yong-jin, and Yang Se-chan. On September 1, SM announced that Doh would release his second EP, Expectation, on September 18. On October 18, 2023, it was announced that Doh would be leaving SM Entertainment and joining a new agency, Company SooSoo, established by his long-time manager Nam Kyung-soo for his personal activities. However, he will continue his activities as an Exo member with SM Entertainment. On November 13, 2023, Doh was confirmed to be cast in the main role in Disney+ series The Manipulated.

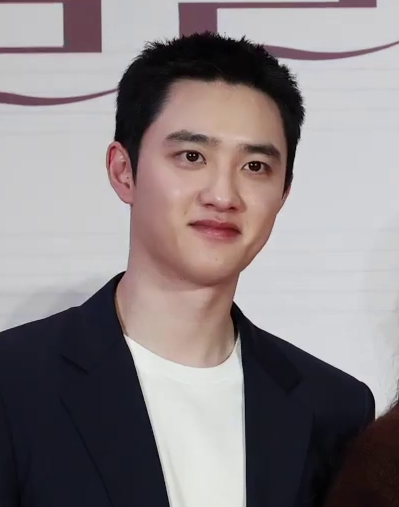
Doh during the promotions for Secret: Untold Melody in January 2025

On January 3, 2024, an official from Company SooSoo confirmed that Doh was preparing his third solo album to be released in the first half of the 2024. In April 2024, Doh announced his third EP Blossom would be released alongside its lead single "Mars" on May 7. He later embarked on an Asian fan concert tour, titled Bloom, that began on June 8, 2024, in Seoul.

On April 11, 2025, Company SooSoo announced that Doh would embark on another tour across Asia for a concert titled Do It! that would begin on July 19, 2025 in Seoul, South Korea. In June 2025, Doh announced his first studio album, titled Bliss, which was released on July 7, 2025. He co-wrote lyrics for the album's lead single "Sing Along!" with Zico, one of the song's composers. On September 8, 2025, Company SooSoo announced that Doh would release a digital single he co-wrote titled "Dumb" featuring rapper Penomeco on September 16. On November 4, 2025, it was announced that Doh would not be renewing his contract with Company SooSoo following its recent expiration, but that the company would continue to support his upcoming Do It! tour dates on December 6 and 7, 2025 in Seoul. The CEO of Blitzway Entertainment confirmed on November 5, 2025 that Doh signed a contract with their company to support his acting endeavors alongside his solo and group musical activities.

On September 8, 2026, he released his fourth EP Dopamine, ahead of his Asia concert tour in October.

== Discography ==
- Bliss (2025)

== Tours ==
=== Bloom (2024) ===
Tour dates
Date	City	Country	Venue	No. of Shows
June 8, 2024	Seoul	South Korea	KBS Arena	1
June 9, 2024	Seoul	South Korea	KBS Arena	2
June 22, 2024	Taipei	Taiwan	Tianmu Gymnasium	1
June 23, 2024	Taipei	Taiwan	Tianmu Gymnasium	1
June 29, 2024	Hong Kong	China	AsiaWorld–Expo	1
July 12, 2024	Jakarta	Indonesia	Kasablanka Hall	1
July 13, 2024	Jakarta	Indonesia	Kasablanka Hall	2
July 18, 2024	Tokyo	Japan	Tachikawa Stage Garden	2
July 19, 2024	Nagoya	Japan	Niterra Hall	1
July 21, 2024	Osaka	Japan	Grand Cube Osaka	2
August 3, 2024	Yokohama	Japan	Pia Arena MM	1
August 4, 2024	Yokohama	Japan	Pia Arena MM	1
August 8, 2024	Singapore	Singapore	Singapore Indoor Stadium	1
August 10, 2024	Bangkok	Thailand	Thunder Dome, Muang Thong Thani	1
August 10, 2024	Bangkok	Thailand	Thunder Dome, Muang Thong Thani	1
August 17, 2024	Kuala Lumpur	Malaysia	Axiata Arena	1
August 31, 2024	Manila	Philippines	Araneta Coliseum	1
September 1, 2024	Manila	Philippines	Araneta Coliseum	1
October 11, 2024	Seoul	South Korea	Jamsil Indoor Stadium	1
October 12, 2024	Seoul	South Korea	Jamsil Indoor Stadium	1
October 13, 2024	Seoul	South Korea	Jamsil Indoor Stadium	1
Total Shows				25

=== DO it! (2025) ===
Tour dates
Date	City	Country	Venue
July 19, 2025	Seoul	South Korea	Korea UNIV. Hwajung Tiger Dome
July 20, 2025	Seoul	South Korea	Korea UNIV. Hwajung Tiger Dome
August 2, 2025	Taipei	Taiwan	NTSU Arena
August 9, 2025	Jakarta	Indonesia	Indonesia Arena
August 16, 2025	Manila	Philippines	SM Mall of Asia Arena
August 23, 2025	Singapore		Singapore Indoor Stadium
August 30, 2025	Kuala Lumpur	Malaysia	Axiata Arena Bukit Jalil
September 20, 2025	Macau	China	Macau Studio City Event Center
October 11, 2025	Bangkok	Thailand	Impact Arena
October 25, 2025	Tokyo	Japan	Tokyo Gymnasium
October 26, 2025	Tokyo	Japan	Tokyo Gymnasium
November 22, 2025	Fukuoka	Japan	Marine Messe Fukuoka
November 23, 2025	Fukuoka	Japan	Marine Messe Fukuoka
December 6, 2025	Seoul	South Korea	Korea University Hwajeong Tiger Dome
December 7, 2025	Seoul	South Korea	Korea University Hwajeong Tiger Dome

== Videography ==
=== Music videos ===
Year	Title	Ref.
2012	"Dear My Family" (as part of SM Town)	
2014	"I'm Your Girl" (Remake)	
2014	"Crying Out"	
2016	"Tell Me (What is Love)"	
2016	"Don't Worry" with Jo Jung-suk	
2017	"Dear My Family (Live Concert Ver.)" (as part of SM Town)	
2021	"Rose"	
2023	"Hope from Kwangya" (as part of SM Town)	
2023	"Somebody"	
2024	"Popcorn"	
2024	"Mars"	
2024	"Small Girl" (Lee Young-ji feat. D.O.)	
2025	"Sing Along! "	

== Filmography ==
=== Film ===
Year	Title	Role	Notes	Ref.
2014	Cart	Choi Tae-young		
2016	Pure Love	Park Hyeong-jun (Beom-sil)		
2016	My Annoying Brother	Go Doo-young		
2017	Room No.7	Lee Tae-jung		
2017	Along with the Gods: The Two Worlds	Private Won Dong-yeon		
2018	Along with the Gods: The Last 49 Days	Private Won Dong-yeon		
2018	Swing Kids	Roh Ki-soo		
2019	Underdog	Moong-chi	Voice	
2023	The Moon	Hwang Seon-woo		
2025	Secret: Untold Melody	Kim Yu-jun		

=== Television series ===
Year	Title	Role	Notes	Ref.
2012	To the Beautiful You	Himself	Cameo (Episode 2)	
2014	It's Okay, That's Love	Han Kang-woo		
2015	Hello Monster	teenage Lee Joon-young		
2018	100 Days My Prince	Na Won-deuk / Lee Yul		
2019	Dear My Room		Cameo (Episode 11)	
2022	Bad Prosecutor	Jin Jung		
2025	The Manipulated	Yo-han		

=== Web series ===
Year	Title	Role	Ref.
2015	Exo Next Door	Fictionalised version of himself	
2016	Be Positive	Kim Hwan-dong	

=== Television shows ===
Year	Title	Role	Ref.
2022	Off The Grid	Cast member	
2023	No Math School Trip	Cast member	
2023	GBRB: Reap What You Sow	Cast member	
2025	GBRB: Joy Pops Laugh Pops	Cast member	

== Theater ==
Year	Title	Role	Notes	Ref.
2020	Return: The Promise of the Day	Kim Seung-ho	Army musical	

== Accolades ==
=== Awards and nominations ===
Name of the award ceremony, year presented, category, nominee of the award, and the result of the nomination
Award ceremony	Year	Category	Nominee/work	Result	Ref.
APAN Star Awards	2014	Best New Actor	It's Okay, That's Love	Won	
Asia Artist Awards	2017	Popularity Award – Actor	Doh Kyung-soo	Won	
Asia Artist Awards	2026	Popularity Award – Actor	Doh Kyung-soo	Pending	
Asian Film Awards	2015	Best Newcomer	Cart	Nominated	
Asian Pop Music Awards (Note: Hosted by the Hong Kong Asia Pacific International Group and Sunway Records, the Asian Pop Music Awards bases its winners on "Asian Pop Music Chart" which opened in September 2019.)	2021	People's Choice Award (Overseas)	Empathy	4th Place	
Asian Pop Music Awards	2021	Best Male Artist (Overseas)	D.O.	Nominated	
Asian Pop Music Awards	2022	People's Choice Award (Overseas)	"Bite"	3rd place	
Baeksang Arts Awards	2015	Best New Actor – Television	It's Okay, That's Love	Nominated	
Baeksang Arts Awards	2016	Most Popular Actor – Film	Pure Love	Won	
Baeksang Arts Awards	2017	Most Popular Actor – Film	My Annoying Brother	Won	
Baeksang Arts Awards	2017	Best New Actor – Film	My Annoying Brother	Nominated	
Baeksang Arts Awards	2019	Most Popular Actor	100 Days My Prince	Won	
Blue Dragon Film Awards	2017	Best New Actor	My Annoying Brother	Won	
Blue Dragon Film Awards	2023	Best Actor	The Moon	Nominated	
Blue Dragon Series Awards	2023	Best Actor	Bad Prosecutor	Nominated	
Brand of the Year Award	2019	Best Male Acting Idol	Doh Kyung-soo	Won	
Buil Film Awards	2018	Popular Star Award	Along with the Gods: The Last 49 Days	Won	
Buil Film Awards	2019	Popular Star Award	Swing Kids	Won	
Buil Film Awards	2023	Popular Star Award	The Moon	Won	
Buil Film Awards	2023	Best Actor	The Moon	Nominated	
DFX Daejeon Special FX Festival Awards	2023	Acting Award	The Moon	Won	
Director's Cut Awards	2018	Best New Actor	Along with the Gods: The Last 49 Days	Won	
Dong-A.com's Pick	2018	Next Generation Noteworthy Actor	Doh Kyung-soo	Won	
Gaon Chart Music Awards	2021	Mubeat Global Choice Award	D.O.	Nominated	
Golden Disc Awards	2022	Album Bonsang	Empathy	Nominated	
Golden Disc Awards	2022	Most Popular Artist Award	D.O.	Nominated	
Grand Bell Awards	2015	Popularity Award	Cart	Nominated	
Grand Bell Awards	2015	Best Supporting Actor	Cart	Nominated	
Grand Bell Awards	2023	Best Actor	The Moon	Nominated	
Hanteo Music Awards	2021	Artist Award - Male Solo	D.O.	Won	
Indonesian Hallyu Fans Choice Awards	2021	Solo Song of the Year	"Rose"	Won	
JIMFF Awards	2017	Star Award	My Annoying Brother	Won	
KBS Drama Awards	2022	Best Couple Award	Doh Kyung-soo (with Lee Se-hee); Bad Prosecutor	Won	
KBS Drama Awards	2022	Popularity Award, Actor	Bad Prosecutor	Won	
KBS Drama Awards	2022	Top Excellence Award, Actor	Bad Prosecutor	Won	
Korea Grand Music Awards	2024	Best Artist	Doh Kyung-soo	Won	
Korea Grand Music Awards	2024	R&B Male	Doh Kyung-soo	Won	
Korea Grand Music Awards	2025	Best OST	Forever (from Resident Playbook)	Won	
Korea Grand Music Awards	2026	Best Listener’s Pick	Guitarist	Won	
Korean Film Shining Star Awards	2017	Newcomer Award (Film)	My Annoying Brother	Won	
Marie Claire Asia Star Awards	2023	Asia Wide Award	The Moon	Honored	
Max Movie Awards	2015	Best New Actor	Cart	Nominated	
Max Movie Awards	2016	Rising Star Award	Doh Kyung-soo	Won	
Mnet Asian Music Awards	2021	Best Male Artist	D.O.	Nominated	
The Seoul Awards	2018	Popularity Actor Award	Along with the Gods: The Last 49 Days	Won	
Seoul International Youth Film Festival	2014	Best Young Actor	It's Okay, That's Love	Won	
Seoul Music Awards	2022	K-wave Special Award	D.O.	Nominated	
Seoul Music Awards	2022	Main Award (Bonsang)	D.O.	Nominated	
Seoul Music Awards	2022	Popularity Award	D.O.	Nominated	
Seoul Music Awards	2025	K-pop World Choice – Solo	D.O.	Nominated	
Seoul Music Awards	2025	K-Wave Special Award	D.O.	Nominated	
Seoul Music Awards	2025	Main Prize (Bonsang)	D.O.	Nominated	
Seoul Music Awards	2025	Popularity Award	D.O.	Nominated	
Seoul Music Awards	2026	New Icon Award	Doh Kyung-soo	Won	
Soompi Awards	2019	Actor of the Year	100 Days My Prince	Won	
Soompi Awards	2019	Best Couple	Doh Kyung-soo (with Nam Ji-hyun); 100 Days My Prince	Won	
SPOTV K-Pop Awards	2026	Best Male Solo Artist	Doh Kyung-soo	Won	

=== Listicles ===
Name of publisher, year listed, name of listicle, and placement
Publisher	Year	Listicle	Placement	Ref.
Korean Film Council	2021	Korean Actors 200 (Note: Introduces 200 actors that best represent the present and future of Korean cinema to the people in the film industry all over the world.)	Included	
