= Seohyun discography =

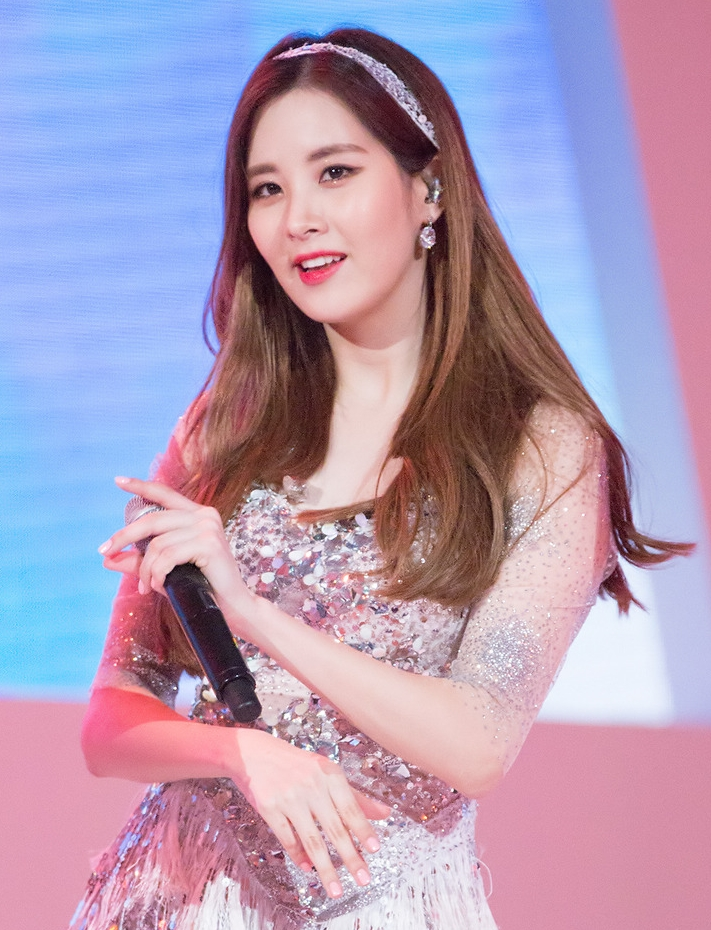
- Seohyun performing in March 2016
- EPs: 1
- Singles: 7
- Music videos: 1
- Promotional singles: 5
- Soundtrack appearances: 7

Seohyun (born Seo Ju-hyun) is a South Korean singer, member of Girls' Generation and its subgroup Girls' Generation-TTS. Since debuting in 2007, she has collaborated with various artists and released several original soundtracks for South Korean TV series. Her career as a solo singer began in January 2017 with the release of her debut extended play Don't Say No.

== Extended plays ==
List of extended plays, with selected chart positions and sales
Title	Details	Peak chart positions				Sales
Title	Details	KOR	JPN	US Heat	US World	Sales
Don't Say No	Released: January 17, 2017; Label: SM Entertainment; Formats: CD, digital download	1	72	23	3	KOR: 33,369; JPN: 1,791

== Singles ==
=== As lead artist ===
Title	Year	Peak positions	Sales (DL)	Album
Title	Year	KOR	Sales (DL)	Album
"Don't Say No"	2017	26	KOR: 68,152	Don't Say No

=== Collaborations ===
Title	Year	Peak chart positions		Sales (DL)	Album
Title	Year	KOR	US World	Sales (DL)	Album
"Love Hate" (with Jessica and Tiffany)	2008	—	—	—N/a	Roommate
"Jjarajajja" (with Joo Hyun-mi and Davichi)	2009	—	—	—N/a	Jjarajajja
"Let's Go" (with various artists)	2010	—	—	—N/a	Let's Go
"Don't Say No" (with Yoon Gun)	2012	17	—	KOR: 305,386	Non-album single
"You Are A Miracle" (with various artists)	2013	32	—	KOR: 53,496	2013 SBS Gayo Daejun Friendship Project
"Secret" (with Yuri)	2016	149	10	KOR: 11,481	Non-album single
"—" denotes songs that did not chart.

=== Promotional singles ===
Title	Year	Peak chart positions	Sales (DL)	Album
Title	Year	KOR	Sales (DL)	Album
"It's Fantastic" (Note: Promotional song for Mabinogi.) (with Jessica and Tiffany)	2008	—	—N/a	It's Fantastic
"Haptic Motion" (Note: Promotional song for Anycall Haptic mobile phones.) (with Taeyeon, Jessica and Sunny)	2008	—	—N/a	Non-album single
"Dreams Come True" (Note: Promotional song for the 2011 Asia Song Festival) (with Donghae)	2011	—	—N/a	2011 Asia Song Festival with UNICEF
"The Magic of Yellow Ribbon" (Note: Promotional song for The Face Shop cosmetics.) (with Kim Hyun-joong)	2011	—	—N/a	Non-album single
"T'Ple Couple Want It!" (Note: Promotional song for SK Telecom.) (with Kyuhyun)	2013	—	—N/a	Non-album single

== Soundtrack appearances ==
Title	Year	Peak chart positions	Sales (DL)	Album
Title	Year	KOR	Sales (DL)	Album
"Touch the Sky" (with Taeyeon, Jessica, Sunny and Tiffany)	2007	—	—N/a	Thirty Thousand Miles in Search of My Son OST
"The Little Boat" (with Taeyeon, Jessica, Sunny and Tiffany)	2008	—	—N/a	Hong Gil-dong OST
"Motion" (with Taeyeon, Jessica, Sunny and Tiffany)	2009	—	—N/a	Heading to the Ground OST
"Haechi" (with Taeyeon, Jessica, Sunny and Tiffany)	2010	276	—N/a	My Friend Haechi
"It's Okay Even If It Hurts"	2010	90	—N/a	Kim Soo Ro OST
"Journey" (with TVXQ)	2011	—	—N/a	Paradise Ranch OST
"I'll Wait for You"	2012	32	KOR: 155,557	Fashion King OST
"Cheap Creeper" (with Taeyeon, Jessica, Sunny and Tiffany)	2014	—	—N/a	Make Your Move OST
"Milky Way"	2022	—N/a	—N/a	Jinxed at First OST
"—" denotes songs that did not chart.

== Songwriting credits ==
Year	Album	Song	Lyrics	
Year	Album	Song	Credited	With
2013	I Got a Boy	"Baby Maybe"	Yes	Sooyoung, Yuri
2013	I Got a Boy	"XYZ"	Yes	Yuri
2014	Holler	"Only U"	Yes	—N/a
2015	Dear Santa	"Dear Santa" (Korean version)	Yes	—N/a
2017	Don't Say No	"Hello"	Yes	Jo Yoon-kyung
2017	Don't Say No	"Magic"	Yes	—N/a
2017	Don't Say No	"Lonely Love"	Yes	—N/a
2017	Don't Say No	"Love & Affection"	Yes	—N/a
2017	Don't Say No	"Bad Love"	Yes	—N/a
2017	Don't Say No	"Moonlight"	Yes	—N/a
2017	Holiday Night	"Holiday"	Yes	—N/a
2017	Holiday Night	"Sweet Talk"	Yes	—N/a

== See also ==
- Girls' Generation discography
- Girls' Generation-TTS discography
