= Dancing Queen (Girls' Generation song) =

- Digital cover

Single by Girls' Generation

from the album I Got a Boy
- Released: December 21, 2012
- Recorded: 2008
- Studio: SM Concert Hall Studio
- Genre: Pop
- Length: 3:35
- Label: S.M. Entertainment
- Composers: Steven Andrew Booker; Aimee Ann Duffy
- Lyricists: Yoon Hyo-sang; Jessica; Tiffany

Girls' Generation singles chronology
"Flower Power" (2012)	"Dancing Queen" (2012)	"I Got a Boy" (2013)

Audio sample
- "Dancing Queen": file; help

Music video
- "Dancing Queen" on YouTube

"Dancing Queen" is a Korean song by South Korean girl group Girls' Generation. It was released on December 21, 2012, as the lead single from their fourth Korean studio album, I Got a Boy (2013). Recorded in 2008, the song was initially scheduled to be released as the title track for the group's second studio album. Nevertheless, the plan was withdrawn, and "Gee" and the titular EP was released instead as their first extended play.

"Dancing Queen" is a remake of the 2008 single "Mercy" by Duffy. It is the first Korean material released by the group after a fourteen-month hiatus from the South Korean music scene to focus on the Japanese music market with their 2012 album Girls & Peace. The song received generally positive reviews from music critics, who favored its "funky pop" production as opposed to the group's signature electropop styles. Commercially, the single peaked atop the Gaon Digital Chart and at number two on the Korea K-Pop Hot 100, and has sold over 500,000 digital units.

== Live performances ==
Girls' Generation performed "Dancing Queen" and "I Got a Boy" live on M! Countdown on January 3, 2013." The group also performed it on their MBC comeback special, Girls' Generation's Romantic Fantasy.

== Commercial reception ==
"Dancing Queen" sold 139,344 copies after its first day of sales and went on to reach number eleven on the Gaon Digital Chart in its first week. In the second week, the single peaked at number one. It also debuted at number two on K-Pop Hot 100. It has sold over 1,010,545 copies.

== Music video ==
=== Background ===
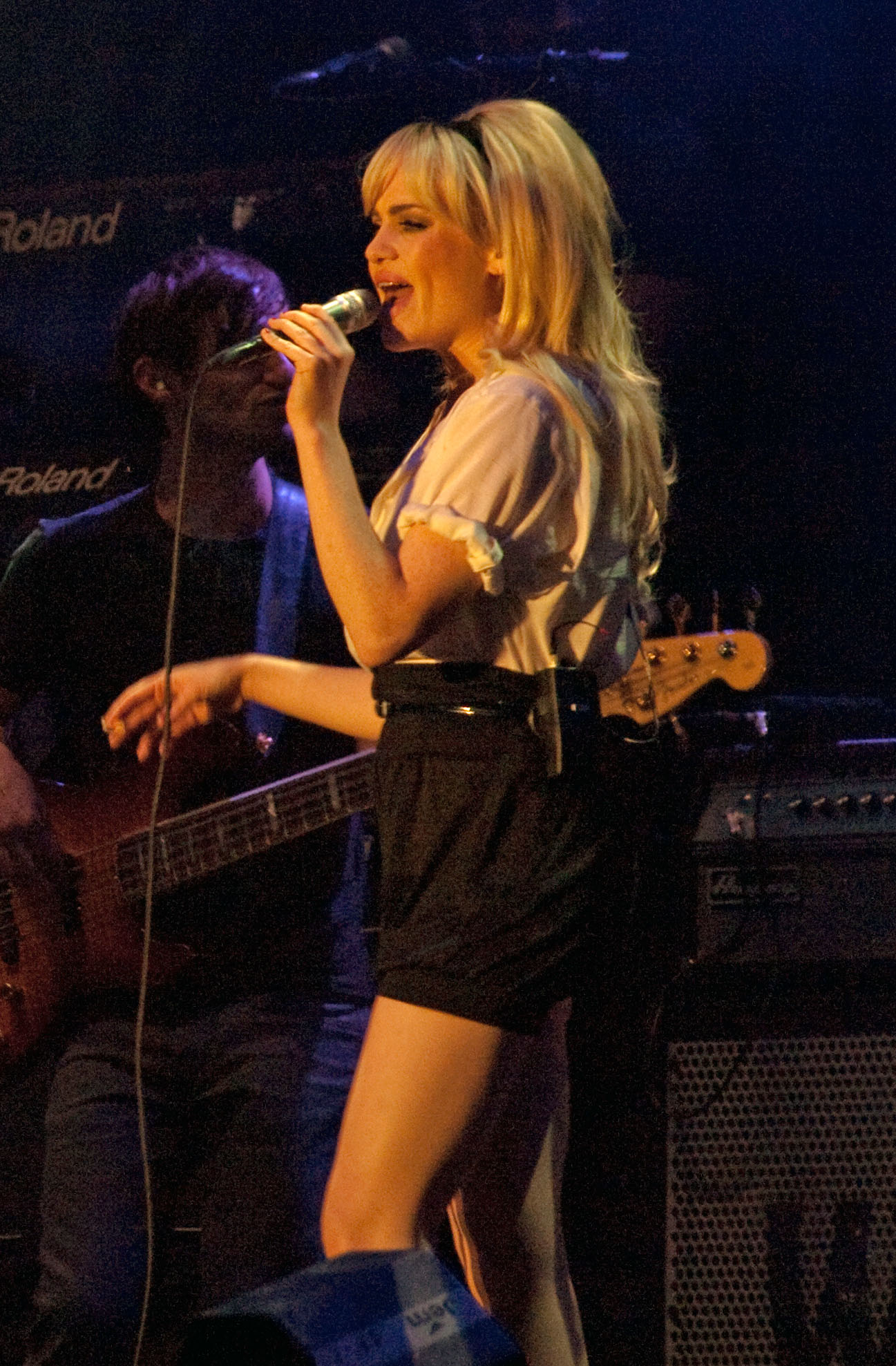
"Dancing Queen" is a cover of Duffy's 2008 single "Mercy".

The music video was released on December 21, 2012, at 10 a.m. KST via Korean music site Naver. Most of the video was originally filmed in 2008, while being bookended with scenes from the music video for "I Got A Boy". The outfits and the concept featured in the music video were instead reworked into what would become "Gee".

A screenshot of the music video was leaked in 2011 along with the audio of the Korean version of "Boomerang," which was later officially released in Japanese on their second Japanese album Girls & Peace (2012).

=== Synopsis ===
The music video, with a running time of 4 minutes, 23 seconds, has a time machine plot. The video begins with the members in a pink doll-like room. Yoona opens up a present to find a small device. The group quickly gathers around and finds out it is a time machine which brings them back to the year 2008 from 2013. The room transforms into a retro-style diner. Tiffany turns on a jukebox with Jessica while they sing the intro. The first verse mainly focuses on the diner. While in the diner, the video transitions from each member's line in a pan-order around the diner. The second verse is focused on the white set, wearing white shirts and jeans (which would be reused in "Gee"). During the bridge, the members throw a party while dancing in groups of three while Tiffany approaches a DJ telling him to play a song. The video cuts back to the center of the diner where the group is dancing with customers and diner staff. Confetti is thrown during the final chorus while the party continues with a final pose in the T-shirt and jean costumes. At the end of the song, the time machine moves forward to 2013 as the words "Ayo GG" spoken by Sooyoung are heard, leading into the teaser for "I Got a Boy". The first part of the teaser is met with audio using mid rock-synths and breaks down into dubstep as Tiffany says, "Ayo stop, let me put it down another way". At the end of the video, the "I Got a Boy" symbol was used with "2013.01.01 comeback" seen below it.

== Credits ==
Credits are adapted from I Got a Boy liner notes.

=== Studio ===
- SM Concert Hall Studio – recording, mixing, digital editing
- Studio-T – strings recording
- Sonic Korea – mastering

=== Personnel ===
- SM Entertainment – executive producer
- Lee Soo-man – producer
- Girls' Generation – vocals
  - Taeyeon – background vocals
  - Jessica – lyrics, background vocals
  - Tiffany – lyrics, background vocals
  - Seohyun – background vocals
  - Sunny – background vocals
- Yoon Hyo-sang – lyrics
- Stephen Andrew Booker – composition
- Aimee Ann Duffy – composition
- Kenzie – arrangement, vocal directing
- Kim Jeong-bae – guitar
- Yong – strings
- Shim Sang-won – strings conducting and arrangement
- Oh Seung-geun – strings recording
- Nam Koong-jin – recording, mixing, digital editing
- Jeon Hoon – mastering

== Charts ==
Chart (2012–13)	Peak position
South Korea (Gaon)	1
South Korea (K-pop Hot 100)	2
US World Digital Songs (Billboard)	5

=== Year-end charts ===
Chart (2013)	Position
South Korea (Gaon)	109
South Korea (K-pop Hot 100)	76
