= Girls' Generation's Romantic Fantasy =

- Genre: TV show
- Presented by: MBC
- Starring: Girls' Generation
- Country of origin: South Korea
- Original languages: Korean language English

Production
- Production locations: Seoul, South Korea
- Camera setup: Multi-camera
- Running time: 80 minutes

Original release
- Release: 1 January 2013

Girls' Generation's Romantic Fantasy was a 2013 New Year's Day comeback special broadcast on Munhwa Broadcasting Corporation (MBC) at 23:15 on 1 January 2013, starring South Korean girl group Girls' Generation. The special follows the group in preparation of their fourth Korean-language album I Got A Boy, released on the same day, along with an accompanying live concert featuring songs from the album, the group's previous hits, and solo performances from members.

== Background ==
On 11 December 2012, the same day Girls' Generation's new album was announced, Korean broadcaster MBC announced that the group would have an exclusive television special for their comeback, instead of appearing on MBC's regular music show, Show! Music Core. The special commenced filming on 23 December 2012, with backstage preparation and live performances of new tracks "I Got a Boy" and "Dancing Queen". On the following day, it was announced the special would be broadcast on 1 January 2013, the release date of their fourth Korean album, I Got A Boy.

This is the second television special the group has done for MBC, following Girls' Generation's Christmas Fairy Tale on 24 December 2011.

== Setlist ==
The setlist of Girls' Generation's Romantic Fantasy goes as follow:

1. "Dancing Queen"
2. "Promise"
3. "Romantic St." (낭만길)
4. "Oh!"
5. "Gee"
6. "Run Devil Run"
7. "The Boys"
8. "Tell Me Your Wish (Genie)"
9. "Mr. Taxi"
10. "Call Me Maybe" (Tiffany solo)
11. "Someday" (Jessica featuring Krystal)
12. "I Am" (나는) (Hyoyeon and Yuri featuring Henry)
13. "Marry You" (Sooyoung, Sunny and Yoona)
14. "Speak Now" (Seohyun solo)
15. "Lost In Love" (유리아이) (Taeyeon & Tiffany)
16. "I Got a Boy"

== Reception ==
According to the AGB Nielsen Media Research the comeback special achieved a nationwide viewership ratings of 3.8 percent. This was higher than both comeback specials broadcast on Seoul Broadcasting System (SBS) in 2012 for Big Bang on 9 March; and BoA on 28 July at 3 and 3.2 percent respectively.
