= I Got a Boy (song) =

Single by Girls' Generation

from the album I Got a Boy
- Released: January 1, 2013
- Recorded: 2012
- Studio: SM Booming System, Seoul
- Genre: Bubblegum pop; electropop; pop-rap; dubstep; R&B
- Length: 4:31
- Label: SM; KT Music
- Composers: Will Simms; Sarah Lundbäck Bell; Anne Judith Wik; Yoo Young-jin
- Lyricist: Yoo Young-jin
- Producers: Will Simms; Yoo Young-jin

Girls' Generation singles chronology
"Dancing Queen" (2012)	"I Got a Boy" (2013)	"Love & Girls" (2013)

Music video
- "I Got a Boy" on YouTube

Professional ratings
Review scores
Source	Rating
Rolling Stone	3.5/5 stars

"I Got a Boy" is a song recorded by South Korean girl group Girls' Generation for their fourth Korean-language studio album of the same name. It was released on January 1, 2013, by SM Entertainment and KT Music. Produced by the group's long-time collaborator Yoo Young-jin and Will Simms, the song is described as a hybrid of various genres including bubblegum pop, dance, and electropop.

"I Got a Boy" was met with critical acclaim from music critics, who praised its eclectic sound and noted it as a "phenomenon" that could challenge popular Western artists like Katy Perry or One Direction. It was a commercial success domestically, debuting at top of the Gaon Digital Chart and has sold over 1.3 million digital copies in South Korea in 2013. Internationally, the single peaked at number 98 on the Japan Hot 100 and number 3 on the US World Digital Songs.

A music video for the song was filmed in October 2012. It features hip hop-inspired dance moves choreographed by Nappytabs. It won the award for Video of the Year at the first YouTube Music Awards in 2013, which generated much attention for beating other popular nominees like Justin Bieber and Psy despite the fact that the group was considered lesser-known to the Western audience at the time.

== Background and composition ==
"I Got a Boy"
A sample of "I Got a Boy", an eclectic mix of various genres

“I Got a Boy” was composed and arranged by European composers Will Simms, Sarah Lundbäck Bell, Anne Judith Wik, and South Korean composer Yoo Young-jin, with the Korean lyrics written by Yoo Young-jin, who is also the group’s longtime collaborator. The song was recorded at SM Entertainment studio, SM Booming System, and was produced by Will Simms and Yoo Young-jin. The song was almost given to Missy Elliott before it was acquired by SM, where the A&R team “came up with various ideas by editing the song day and night.” Girls' Generation member Tiffany said the song's eclectic structure was in part inspired by the group's managers, who encouraged them to release bolder music that suited them more as they aged, saying, “We had discussed that we wanted to do something more challenging. This felt like it was it, because I had never heard anything like it yet. The song is a song that keeps giving.”

"I Got a Boy" is a K-pop and dubstep-type song that is described as an eclectic mix of various genres. According to U.S. magazine Billboard, the track features elements of electropop and minimal drum and bass. The song also features nine distinct tonal shifts in the song, with Lundbäck Bell saying that SM Entertainment wanted it to sound like a musical showtune song, adding, "They said they really wanted to make the song into a musical feel, in the storyline. Because they really wanted the song to be about a girl that meets a boy and all her friends are telling her, like, ‘You’re an idiot. What can you see in this boy? He’s not good for you,’ and she's like ‘Well, I got a boy.’” On reviewing I Got a Boy album for the same publication, Jeff Benjamin noted dubstep elements on the song. Meanwhile, Rolling Stone's Nick Catucci opined that "I Got a Boy" was made up of a range of genres from minimal R&B to "high-BPM" dance. Writing for Time, Douglas Wolk described the track as a "monomaniacally charming" hybrid of bubblegum pop, dubstep, and hard rock. Meanwhile, AllMusic's David Jefferies characterized "I Got a Boy" as a mix of dubstep, EDM, and pop-rap. The song was composed in the key of E minor, with a tempo of 98 beats per minute.

== Music video and promotion ==
The music video was praised for its flamboyant fashion style, particularly with this scene in which Girls' Generation perform the choreography.

On January 1, 2013, Girls' Generation performed "I Got a Boy" for the first time on their MBC comeback special Girls’ Generation’s Romantic Fantasy. To further promote the song, the group appeared on several South Korean shows in 2013 including Mnet's M! Countdown, KBS' Music Bank, MBC's Music Core, and SBS's Inkigayo.

The music video for the song was directed by Hong Won-ki for Zanybros, and was choreographed by Nappytabs, who had worked with the group's labelmates TVXQ and BoA. It aired on Mnet and was released on SM Entertainment's YouTube channel on January 1, 2013.

According to MTV's Liza Darwin, the costumes featured in the music video included streetwear fashion such as Kenzo x Opening Ceremony, Adidas Collection by Jeremy Scott and printed leggings; Stüssy's "Good Vibe" T-shirt, Obey's "OG Basic" crewneck, and Joyrich varsity jacket. In the sleepover scene, the girls are seen wearing clothes by UK independent label Lazy Oaf, such as a Batman shirt, a "fruity" T-shirt, and a "pizza crewneck". The fashion style in the visual was hailed as "a kaleidoscopic streetwear explosion", and the music video itself "a fashion whirlwind ... jam-packed with rad clothes". Clyde Barretto from Prefix magazine opined that the video was "more colorful than a rainbow" and featured "alluring" and "bombastic" dance moves.

The video became an instant success on YouTube, achieving over 20 million views within six days and becoming the fastest K-pop video to achieve such a feat at its time of release. It reached 200 million views on November 3, 2017, and has since amassed over 247 million views on YouTube as of September 2021.

== Critical reception ==
"I Got a Boy" received critical acclaim from music critics. The Los Angeles Times music critic Randall Roberts called it a "scattered anthem" and a "gleefully chaotic" song that could "indicate pop music's future trajectory." Billboard K-Town columnist Jeff Benjamin praised the song as "one of the most-forward thinking lead pop singles heard in any country" for its intense mix of different sounds and melodies, and commended Girls’ Generation for "[setting] the bar truly high for pop in 2013." Staff writers of Entertainment Weekly picked "I Got a Boy" as Girls' Generation "key track" and recommended the group as one of the fifteen "artists to watch" in 2013.

Rolling Stone's contributor Nick Catucci described the song as a "musical gymnastics routine." Upon reviewing I Got a Boy album for AllMusic, David Jefferies named "I Got a Boy" a highlight on the album. Time named "I Got a Boy" the 5th best song on their Top 10 Songs of the Year list, calling it a "pop phenomenon" that rivals the likes of One Direction and Katy Perry. In August 2014, Pitchfork Media's Jakob Dorof listed the song as part of his 20 Essential K-Pop Songs Lists, writing that "I Got a Boy" helped "prove the adventurousness of K-pop’s listenership," and believed it was "perhaps the most structurally variable mega-hit since 'Bohemian Rhapsody'." In 2017, Billboard named the song number 21 on their list of 100 Greatest Girl Group Songs of All Time. At the end of 2019, the publication named the song as one of the 100 songs that defined the 2010s as well as their fifth best K-pop song of the 2010s.

"I Got a Boy" on critic lists
Publication	Year	List	Rank	Ref.
Billboard	2013	20 Best K-pop Songs of 2013: K-Town Picks	10	
Billboard	2017	The 100 Greatest Girl Group Songs of All Time	21	
Billboard	2019	The 100 Greatest K-pop Songs of the 2010s	5	
Billboard	2019	100 Songs That Defined the Decade	No order	
Billboard	2023	100 Best Pop Songs Never to Hit the Hot 100	27	
The Dong-a Ilbo	2016	Best female songs according to experts	6	
Melon	2021	Top 100 K-pop Songs of All Time	33	
Pitchfork	2014	20 Essential K-pop Songs	No order	
Time	2013	Top 10 Songs of 2013	5	

== Accolades ==
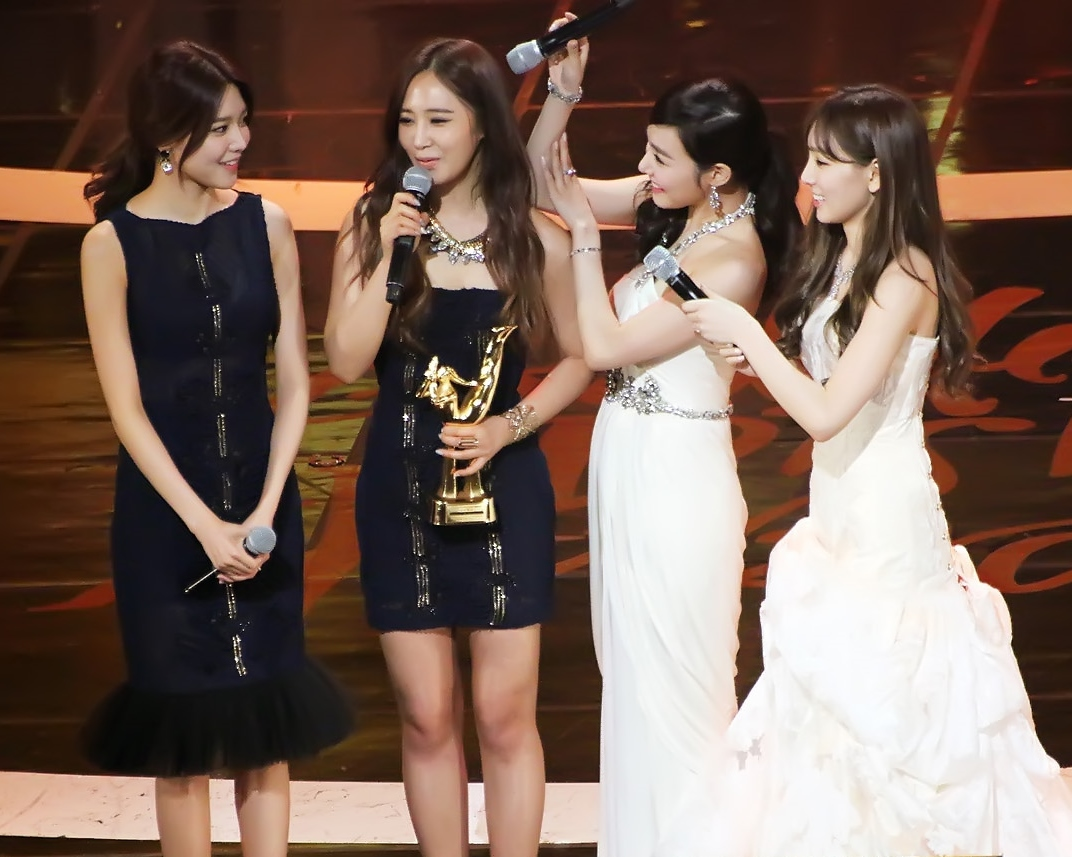
Girls' Generation at the 2014 Golden Disc Awards

The song was nominated for Song of the Year at the 2013 Mnet Asian Music Awards. The music video for "I Got a Boy" won the award for Video of the Year at the first YouTube Music Awards, held on November 3, 2013, at Pier 36 in New York City. Following the event, Girls' Generation received a considerable amount of negative feedback from Western audience as the group was not well known in the United States compared to other nominees for the same category including Psy, Justin Bieber and Lady Gaga. As a result of the controversial event, the music video gained 86,000 views on the awards day, up from 25,000 the day before. The following five days, it achieved an increase of 327% in viewership.

Awards and nominations
Year	Organization	Award	Result	Ref.
2013	Gaon Chart Music Awards	Song of the Month (January)	Won	
2013	Mnet 20's Choice Awards	Hot Online Music	Nominated	
2013	Mnet Asian Music Awards	Song of the Year	Nominated	
2013	YouTube Music Awards	Video of the Year	Won	
2014	Golden Disc Awards	Digital Bonsang	Nominated	
2014	Myx Music Awards	Favorite K-Pop Video	Nominated	

Music program awards
Program	Date	Ref.
M Countdown	January 10, 2013	
M Countdown	January 17, 2013	
M Countdown	January 24, 2013	
Music Bank	January 11, 2013	
Music Bank	January 18, 2013	
Music Bank	January 25, 2013	

== Commercial performance ==
"I Got a Boy" was a domestic success; it debuted atop the South Korean Gaon Digital Chart on the week commencing December 30, 2013, selling 319,824 copies within its first week of release. The following week, the single dropped to number four, selling 242,803 copies. The single sold over 1.35 million copies in South Korea in 2013, becoming the 13th best-selling single of the year in the country. On the K-pop Hot 100, "I Got a Boy" debuted at number 36 on the week of January 12, 2013. The following week, the single charted at number one on the chart and remained its peak for a further week. Furthermore, the song hit number 1 on the monthly Gaon Digital Chart for the month of January. It was also a success on South Korea's music programs, achieving the top spot on M Countdown (three consecutive weeks), and Music Bank (three consecutive weeks). Internationally, "I Got a Boy" became the fourth best-selling K-pop single in the United States in 2013, behind Psy's "Gangnam Style" and "Gentleman" and Big Bang's "Fantastic Baby".

== Credits ==
Credits adapted from I Got a Boy album liner notes.

=== Studio ===
- SM Booming System – recording, mixing, digital editing
- Sonic Korea – mastering

=== Personnel ===
- SM Entertainment – executive producer
- Lee Soo-man – producer
- Girls' Generation – vocals
  - Taeyeon – background vocals
  - Jessica – background vocals
  - Tiffany – background vocals
  - Seohyun – background vocals
  - Sunny – background vocals
- Yoo Young-jin – producer, Korean lyrics, composition, arrangement, vocal directing, background vocals, recording, mixing, digital editing, music and sound supervisor
- Yang Geun-young – background vocals
- Will Simms – producer, composition, arrangement
- Sarah Lundbäck Bell – composition, arrangement
- Anne Judith Wik – composition, arrangement
- Jeon Hoon – mastering
- Kim Young-min – executive supervisor

== Charts ==
=== Weekly charts ===
Weekly chart positions
Chart (2013)	Peak position
Japan (Japan Hot 100)	98
South Korea (Gaon)	1
South Korea (K-pop Hot 100)	1
US World Digital Songs (Billboard)	3

=== Monthly charts ===
Monthly chart positions
Chart (2013)	Peak position
South Korea (Gaon)	1

=== Year-end charts ===
Year-end chart positions
Chart (2013)	Position
South Korea (Gaon)	13
South Korea (K-pop Hot 100)	20
US World Digital Songs (Billboard)	13
