= I Got a Boy =

- Digital cover

Studio album by Girls' Generation
- Released: January 1, 2013
- Recorded: August–December 2012
- Genres: K-pop; R&B; new wave; EDM; jazz; soul
- Length: 35:34
- Language: Korean
- Labels: SM; KT Music; Dreamus
- Producers: Yoo Young-jin; Steve Booker; Stereotypes; Will Simms; Kenzie; Charlie Mason; Mitch Hansen; Joseph Belmaati; Park Chang-hyun; Trinity; Victoria Horn; Hyuk Shin; Jordan Kyle

Girls' Generation chronology
Girls & Peace (2012)	I Got a Boy (2013)	Love & Peace (2013)

Singles from I Got A Boy
- 1. "Dancing Queen" Released: December 21, 2012; 2. "I Got a Boy" Released: January 1, 2013

Physical cover

I Got a Boy (stylized in all caps) is the fourth Korean studio album (sixth overall) by South Korean girl group Girls' Generation. It was released for digital download on January 1, 2013, by SM Entertainment, and was made available for physical sales the following day by KT Music. Musically, the album is characterized as combining elements from a wide range of genres including R&B, new wave, and EDM. This is the last Korean studio album with their founding member Jessica before her dismissal from the group in 2014 and subsequent departure from SM Entertainment in 2015.

I Got a Boy received mixed reviews from music critics; it was praised for its eclectic musical styles, however others were favorable towards only a few songs on the album. Commercially, it was a success domestically, peaking atop the South Korean Gaon Album Chart and became the second best-selling album of 2013 in the country. The album additionally charted at number seven on the Japanese Oricon Albums Chart, number three on the Taiwanese G-Music chart, and number one on the Billboard World Albums.

To promote the album, Girls' Generation appeared and performed on several music programs including Music Bank and Show! Music Core in early 2013. The album's lead single was "Dancing Queen", a remake of Duffy's 2008 single "Mercy", released on December 21, 2012. The second single, "I Got a Boy", was released on January 1, 2013, and was subjected to major attention from Western media outlets following its winning Video of the Year at the inaugural YouTube Music Awards.

== Background and release ==
After the group's label SM Entertainment revealed the group intended to return in January 2013, MBC announced on December 11, 2012, that the group would be receiving a separate broadcast depicting the album process in preparation of the album's release in January 2013. The single track, "Dancing Queen", was released on December 21, 2012. The title track, "I Got a Boy", was released digitally on January 1, 2013. The full album was released on January 2, 2013. Prior to the release in October, member Seohyun said: "This album is really different from our usual ones. It’s like challenging a person's limits. I'm looking forward to what the fans will think, and because it’s still a secret amongst us, I just feel nervous."

== Composition ==
Dsign Music, the group of famous composers that composed the hit song, "Genie", as well as the top composers of Europe including Will Simms and Sarah Lundback, and the composer from Korea, Young-Jin Yoo participated in the making of the album. "I Got a Boy" is an electronic dance song that mixes pop, retro, and urban genres. "Talk Talk" is the Korean version of Boomerang which was included in their second Japanese studio album Girls & Peace, and the Korean lyrics tell a guy who does not understand a girl's heart should try to talk to his girl that it gives the feeling different from Japanese version while it has the same melody and arrangement.

"Baby Maybe", mixes lyrics written by Girls' Generation members Sooyoung, Yuri, and Seohyun that expresses the fluttering heart of a girl in love. "XYZ" with a powerful synthesizer pattern is also written by Yuri and Seohyun. The album also contains "Lost in Love (유리아이)", a duet by Taeyeon and Tiffany expresses the changes of heart that accepts the breakup with a lover as time passes. The track "Promise" is a mid-tempo soul ballad composed and arranged by British songwriter Joseph Belmaati in his debut collaboration with the group. The lyrics were penned by Mo-ul and contain a message for the fans. "Express 999" is retro pop combining 1980s new wave influences, and various genres. "Look at Me" combines organic beats, a playful melody, and easy-to-sing-along chorus. "Romantic St." is a swing jazz style song.

The next album is really going to be something new. Because we were thinking of testing the limits with the genre and music color. When we first heard the song and saw the choreography, we had doubts as to whether or not we could do it. It's a dance we’ve never danced before, so it could be something the person doing it would fear. It could also be a new attempt for the company, but my heart also beats that much more.

— Sooyoung talks about what to expect on the album on Harper's Bazaar.

== Singles ==
"Dancing Queen" was released as a pre-release single on December 21, 2012. "Dancing Queen", a remake of Welsh singer Duffy's song "Mercy" was recorded in 2008 as a comeback song after a nine-month hiatus, however plans were scrapped due to copyright issues and the group went with "Gee".

"I Got a Boy" was released digitally on January 1, 2013. The "I Got A Boy" music video and album were released simultaneously at 5 p.m. KST. The video, as well as the teaser in the "Dancing Queen" video, became the center of public scrutiny after several screenshots from the video circulated on the internet with Sunny's hat having the words "WELCOME MOTHERF★CKERS" printed on it.

== Reception ==
Professional ratings
Review scores
Source	Rating
AllMusic	3.5/5 stars
Billboard	70/100
IZM	2.5/5 stars
Rolling Stone	3.5/5 stars
Weiv	4.5/10

I Got a Boy received mixed reviews from music critics. David Jeffries from AllMusic called the album an "explosion," writing: "Fans will embrace it with open arms, while mega-fans should also clear some shelf space since the physical edition of the album was made available with ten different covers, one for each member of the group and then one with the whole crew." Jeff Benjamin writing for Billboard wrote that the album's musical styles "satisfy not only K-pop fans but also listeners of all types of popular music" with elements of "forward-thinking" genres such as EDM, R&B, and new wave.

Hwang Seon-eop from South Korean online magazine IZM, however, was less enthusiastic towards the album's "experimental" styles and singled out "Baby Maybe" and "Romantic St." as the two better songs on the album. Music critics from webzine Weiv were generally unfavorable of the album; critic Choi Min-woo wrote that "in the end, the only thing that stands out is 'I Got a Boy'". Idology's Mimryo likewise complimented the musicality of the title track, although he expressed boredom with the remainder of the record.

A week after the release of "Dancing Queen," the song was number one on the Gaon Single chart. I Got a Boy debuted at the number two spot of Billboard's World Album Chart. They also placed 2nd on the Heatseekers Albums Chart and 23rd on the Independent Albums Chart. The album ranked 7th on Oricon Weekly Chart and ranked 22nd on Oricon Monthly Chart. "I Got a Boy" also rank first on Five Music Korean-Japanese Chart in Taiwan for two weeks in a row.

== Promotion ==
The first of the group's comeback performances began on January 3, 2013, on Mnet's M! Countdown. Seven members appeared on Mnet's Wide Open Studio program prior to their comeback performance, Yuri and Hyoyeon were not present as they were preparing to emcee M! Countdown. The group continued their first week of performances for the album on KBS' Music Bank, MBC's Music Core and SBS's Inkigayo on January 4, 5 and 6, respectively. Girls' Generation held an hour-long "Virtual Concert" broadcast live via Naver Music on January 5, 2013, where they perform "I Got a Boy", "Talk Talk" and "Dancing Queen". The group also performed five songs from the album on their MBC comeback special; Girls' Generation's Romantic Fantasy on January 1, 2013. The group also performed on KBS Hope Concert. The group performed "I Got a Boy" and "Dancing Queen" in Dream K-Pop Fantasy concert held in Manila, Philippines on January 19, 2013, making it their first overseas performance of both songs. On KBS Yoo Hee-Yeol's Sketchbook, the group performed "I Got a Boy", "Dancing Queen", and "Lost in Love". They performed their single "I Got a Boy" as part of the setlist on their Second Japan Arena Tour.

The album was officially tour promoted on Girls' Generation World Tour Girls & Peace, began on June 8, 2013, in Olympic Gymnastics Arena, Seoul, South Korea, finished on February 15, 2014, in Cotai Arena, Macau. The tour also promotes their third studio album, The Boys (2011), officially, and promoted their second Japanese studio album, Girls & Peace (2012), outside Japan.

== Track listing ==
Credits adapted from Naver

I Got a Boy – Standard edition
No.	Title	Lyrics	Music	Arrangement	Length
1.	"I Got a Boy"	Yoo Young-jin	Yoo Young-jin; Will Simms; Anne Judith Wik; Sarah Lundbäck Bell (The Kennel)	Will Simms; Anne Judith Wik; Sarah Lundbäck Bell (The Kennel)	4:31
2.	"Dancing Queen"	Yoon Hyo-sang; Jessica; Tiffany	Stephen Andrew Booker; Aimee Ann Duffy	Kenzie	3:35
3.	"Baby Maybe"	Sooyoung; Yuri; Seohyun	Mich Hansen; Jonas Jeberg; Ruth-Anne Cunningham; Victoria Lott	Im Kwang-wook (Devine Channel)	3:43
4.	"Talk Talk" (말해봐; Malhaebwa)	Tesung Kim (Iconic Sounds)	Charlie Mason; Oscar Michael G. Rres; Danny Saucedo	Charlie Mason; Oscar Michael G. Rres; Danny Saucedo	2:46
5.	"Promise"	Mo-ul	Joseph Belmaati	Joseph Belmaati	3:15
6.	"Express 999"	Kim Jeong-bae	Kenzie	Kenzie	3:27
7.	"Lost in Love" (유리아이; Yuria-i; lit. 'Glass Child') (Taeyeon and Tiffany duet)	Park Chang-hyun	Park Chang-hyun		4:00
8.	"Look at Me"	Jeon Gan-di	Johan Gustafson (Trinity Music); Fredrik Häggstam (Trinity Music); Sebastian Lundberg (Trinity Music); Louis Schoorl	Trinity Music; Louis Schoorl	3:01
9.	"XYZ"	Yuri; Seohyun	Jonathan Yip; Jeremy L. Reeves; Ray Romulus; Victoria Horn	Tesung Kim (Iconic Sounds); Kim Yong-sin (Iconic Sounds)	3:15
10.	"Romantic St." (낭만길; Namman-gil)	Lee Dae-hee (ZigZag Note); Kim Ki-wook (ZigZag Note); Lee Chan-mi; Mafly (Joombas)	Jordan Kyle (J27); Hyuk Shin (Joombas)	Jordan Kyle (J27); Hyuk Shin (Joombas); Matthew Heath; Hailey Collier; DK (Joombas); Yoo Ji-yoon (Joombas)	4:00
Total length:					35:40

I Got a Boy – Taiwan Edition (DVD bonus tracks)
No.	Title	Length
1.	"I Got a Boy" (Music Video)
2.	"Dancing Queen" (Music Video)
3.	"I Got a Boy" (Music Video Making Film)

Notes

- "Dancing Queen" (recorded in 2008) is a remake of the song, "Mercy", by Welsh singer Duffy.
- "Baby Maybe" was originally co-written as a demo in English by English singer-songwriter Pixie Lott under the title as "What You Do." The song was later given to Girls' Generation with Seohyun, Yuri and Sooyoung re-writing the lyrics in Korean.
- "Talk Talk" (previously titled Boomerang) was recorded in 2008. A Japanese version was included in their second Japanese studio album, Girls & Peace (2012).
- "Lost in Love" is a duet song sung by Taeyeon and Tiffany.
- "Express 999" is a reference to the Anime Galaxy Express 999.

== Personnel ==
Credits for I Got a Boy adapted are from album liner notes.

- Girls' Generation – vocals
  - Taeyeon – main vocal, background vocal
  - Jessica – main vocal, background vocal
  - Sunny – lead vocal, background vocal
  - Tiffany – lead vocal, background vocal
  - Hyoyeon – vocal, rapper
  - Yuri – vocal, rapper, songwriter, background vocals
  - Sooyoung – vocal, rapper, songwriter
  - Yoona – vocal, rapper
  - Seohyun – lead vocal, background vocal, songwriter
- Yoo Young-jin – producer, songwriter, translator, audio mixing, recording
- Will Simms – songwriting, producer
- Yang Geunyeong – background vocals
- Anne Judith Wik – songwriter
- Sarah Lundback Bell – songwriter
- Kim Jungbae – guitar
- Yoong – strings
- Park Chang-hyun – songwriting, background vocal, producer, piano, keyboard, programming
- Shim Sangwon – string arrangement, conductor
- Choi Wonhyuk – bass guitar
- Moul – songwriter
- Joseph Belmaati – songwriter, producer
- Stephen Andrew Booker – songwriter, producer
- Aimee Ann Duffy – songwriter
- Nam Goongjin – recording, mixing
- Im Kwangwook – arrangement
- Mich Hansen – songwriter, producer
- Jonas Jeberg – songwriter
- Ruth-Anne Cunningham – songwriter
- Jung Eunkyung – recording
- Jung Euisuk – recording, mixing
- Kim Jung-bae – songwriter
- Goo Jongpil – mixing
- Kim Tae-sung – songwriter, translator
- Im Yoonjae – vocal director
- Charlie Mason – songwriter, producer
- Oscar Gorres – songwriter, songwriter
- Danny Saucedo – songwriter
- Choi Yeongkyung – vocal director
- Lee Sungho – recording
- Lee Joohyung – recording
- Kim Jung-bae – songwriting
- Shinmin – string arrangement, conductor
- Hong Junho – guitar
- Lee Sanghoon – drums
- Kenzie – organ, producer, recording, vocal director
- Jun Gandi – songwriter
- Johan Gustafson – songwriter, producer
- Jee Yoon Yoo – songwriter
- Lee Shinsung – songwriter
- Fredrik Häggstam – songwriter, producer
- Sebastian Lundberg – songwriter, producer
- Pixie Lott – songwriter
- Louis Schoorl – songwriter
- Hwang Hyun – vocal director, recording
- Lee Joohyung – vocal director
- Choi Yeongkyung – background vocals
- Jonathan Yip – producer
- Ray Romulus – producer
- Reremy Reeves – producer
- Kim Taesung – arrangement
- Kim Yongshin – arrangement
- Nam Goongjin – mixing
- Kim Jiyeon – background vocal
- Lee Joohyung – recording
- Hyuk Shin – songwriter, producer
- Matthew Heath – songwriter
- Hailey Collier – songwriter
- DK – songwriter
- Jordan Kyle – songwriter, producer
- Lee Yoonji – guitar
- Lee Chanmi – songwriter
- Sumi – songwriter
- Lee Soo Man – executive producer

== Charts ==
=== Weekly charts ===
Chart (2013)	Peak position
Japanese Albums (Oricon)	7
South Korean Albums (Gaon)	1
Taiwanese Albums (G-Music)	3
US World Albums (Billboard)	1
US Heatseekers Albums (Billboard)	2
US Independent Albums (Billboard)	23

=== Monthly charts ===
Chart (2013)	Peak position
South Korean Albums (Gaon)	1

=== Year-end charts ===
Chart (2013)	Position
South Korean Albums (Gaon)	2

== Sales ==
Region	Sales amount
Japan	54,000
South Korea	318,886
United States	3,000

== Release history ==
Region	Release date	Format	Distributor
Worldwide	January 1, 2013	Digital download	SM Entertainment
South Korea	January 2, 2013	CD	SM Entertainment, KMP Holdings
Singapore	January 7, 2013	CD	Universal Music
Thailand	January 8, 2013	CD	SM Entertainment
Hong Kong	January 14, 2013	CD	Universal Music
Japan	February 13, 2013	CD	Nayutawave Records
Indonesia	June 4, 2013	CD	Universal Music Indonesia
Taiwan	July 17, 2013	CD + DVD	Universal Music Taiwan
