= Don't Say No (EP) =

EP by Seohyun
- Released: January 17, 2017
- Recorded: October–December 2016; SM Studios, Seoul, South Korea
- Genres: Pop; R&B; dance; jazz; soul
- Length: 23:20
- Languages: Korean; English
- Labels: SM; KT Music; Universal Music; Island; Def Jam; Sony Music; Columbia

Singles from Don't Say No
- 1. "Don't Say No" Released: January 17, 2017

Don't Say No is the debut extended play by South Korean singer Seohyun. It was released by SM Entertainment on January 17, 2017. The EP marked the official solo debut of Seohyun, who had been known as a member of South Korean girl group Girls' Generation for ten years.

== Composition ==
The EP consists of seven tracks, of which six were written by Seohyun. Talking about the EP, she said, "The theme of the album is love. I want to show 100% of my emotions by writing all the songs because [SM Entertainment] is so strict; I have to say that I have had to adhere to the concept at all times being part of Girls' Generation." The opening track "Don't Say No" is a R&B and dance pop song featuring a "funky" piano rhythm. Songs "Hello", "Magic", and "Lonely Love" are inspired by 1990s pop and R&B genres. "Love & Affection" features piano and bass, while "Bad Love" is a mid-tempo track, and "Moonlight" is an uptempo number.

== Release and promotion ==
On January 10, 2017, Seohyun was announced to be debuting as a solo singer with Don't Say No, becoming the third Girls' Generation member to have released a solo album, after Taeyeon and Tiffany. On January 13, the album's track list was released, revealing that South Korean singer Eric Nam was featured on one of the tracks. A promotional showcase for the album, where Seohyun performed "Magic", "Lonely Love" and "Don't Say No" for the first time, was held at SM Coex Artium in Seoul on January 16. Don't Say No and the title track's music video were released digitally on January 17. The next day, physical copies became available at retail outlets.

The EP was promoted on multiple Korean music shows, with her first performing "Don't Say No" and "Magic" on the 19th on M Countdown. She then appeared on Music Bank on the 20th. The following day, she performed "Don't Say No" and "Lonely Love" on the program Show! Music Core. Her final appearance for the EP on shows was on Inkigayo. She later held a residency show titled Love, Still – Seohyun, part of The Agit series of residency shows by SM Entertainment artists, at SM Coex Artium from February 24 to 26 to promote the EP.

== Commercial performance ==
Don't Say No debuted atop the South Korean Gaon Album Chart and reached number three on the Billboard World Albums Chart. It later placed at number five on the Gaon Album Chart for the month of January 2017 with 33,041 physical copies sold.

== Track listing ==
Don't Say No track listing
No.	Title	Lyrics	Music	Arrangement	Length
1.	"Don't Say No"	Kenzie	Kenzie; Matthew Tishler; Felicia Barton	Matthew Tishler	3:13
2.	"Hello" (featuring Eric Nam)	Seohyun; Jo Yoon-kyung	Andrew Underberg; Felicia Barton; Andrew Choi	Andrew Underberg; Felicia Barton; Andrew Choi	3:18
3.	"Magic"	Seohyun	Albin Nordqvist; Ellen Berg Tollbom; Hjalmar Wilen; Deez	Albin Nordqvist; Deez	3:33
4.	"Lonely Love" (혼자하는 사랑)	Seohyun	The Stereotypes; August Rigo; Sophia Pae	The Stereotypes	3:39
5.	"Love & Affection"	Seohyun	Johan Gustafsson; Fredrik Haggstam; Sebastian Lundberg; Hayley Aitken; Lauren Dyson; Trinity	Trinity	2:48
6.	"Bad Love"	Seohyun	James "Gladius" Wong; Krysta Youngs; Sidnie Tipton	James "Gladius" Wong; Krysta Youngs; Sidnie Tipton	3:17
7.	"Moonlight" (달빛)	Seohyun	Nicolas Jack Scapa (10K Islands); Brian Robertson; Alexandra Hughes; Ryan S. Jhun	Nicolas Jack Scapa (10K Islands); Brian Robertson; Alexandra Hughes; Ryan S. Jhun	3:32
Total length:					23:20

== Charts ==
=== Weekly charts ===
Weekly chart performance for Don't Say No
Chart (2017)	Peak position
Japanese Albums (Oricon)	73
South Korean Albums (Gaon)	1
US World Albums (Billboard)	3
US Heetseekers Albums (Billboard)	23

=== Monthly charts ===
Monthly chart performance for Don't Say No
Chart (2017)	Peak position
South Korean Albums (Gaon)	5

== Sales ==
Sales for Don't Say No
Chart (2017)	Sales
South Korean (Gaon)	33,369
Japan (Oricon)	1,791

== Accolades ==
Music program awards
Song	Program	Date	Ref.
"Don't Say No"	M Countdown	January 26, 2017	

== Release history ==
Release dates and formats for Don't Say No
Region	Date	Format	Label	Ref.
Various	January 17, 2017	Digital download	SM	
South Korea	January 18, 2017	CD	SM, KT Music	
Australia	February 10, 2017	CD, Digital download	Sony Music	
United States	February 10, 2017	CD, Digital download	SM, Sony Music, Columbia	
Malaysia	March 10, 2017	Digital download, CD	Universal Music, Island	

== See also ==
- Seohyun discography
- List of M Countdown Chart winners (2017)
