= YouTube Music Awards =

- Awarded for: Best in music videos
- Country: United States
- Presented by: YouTube
- First award: November 3, 2013; 13 years ago
- Final award: March 23, 2015; 11 years ago
- Website: /YouTube /YTMA

The YouTube Music Awards (commonly abbreviated as YTMA) was an awards show presented by the American video platform YouTube to honor the best in the music video medium.

== History ==
For the 2013 edition, the YTMAs were held at Pier 36 in New York City and broadcast live at Youtube.com/YTMA. The live award show was preceded by a series of events all-day in locations around the world; including Seoul, Moscow, Rio de Janeiro, and London, respectively. Performers included Arcade Fire, Lindsey Stirling, Tyler, The Creator, M.I.A., Lady Gaga and Eminem, among others. The award show started at 6pm EST and was scheduled for 90 minutes.

Fans voted in each category by sharing specific links from the Youtube.com/YTMA on either their Facebook, Google+ or Twitter accounts or by video views for nominees. The video with the most views, shares, comments, and/or likes in each category was determined the winner. Artist of the Year was won by Eminem and Video of the Year was won by Girls' Generation for their video "I Got a Boy".

The 2013 edition was directed by Spike Jonze. The show was mostly unscripted because Jonze wanted the show to "..feel like a YouTube video — the raw messiness of making stuff..."

The winners of the 2015 edition of the award show were announced on March 2, 2015. Fifty winners were chosen based on the "growth in views, subscribers, and engagement over the last six months."

With that YouTube personally gives out plaque/button for milestones reached on subscriber counts. These can be reached through the videos.

- Silver Play Button - 100,000 subscriber count
- Gold Diamond Play Button - 1,000,000 subscriber count
- Diamond Play Button - 10,000,000 subscriber count
- Red Diamond Play Button - 100,000,000 subscriber count

== List of ceremonies ==
Year	Date	Venue	Host city	Host	Main sponsor
2013	November 3	Pier 36	New York City	Jason Schwartzman and Reggie Watts	Kia
2015	March 23	Online		Tyler Oakley	Kia

== Awards ==
- Breakthrough of the Year
- Response of the Year
- Innovation of the Year
- YouTube Phenomenon
- Video of the Year
- Artist of the Year
