= Twinkle (EP) =

EP by Girls' Generation-TTS
- Released: April 29, 2012
- Recorded: January– March 2012
- Studio: SM Studios, (Seoul, South Korea)
- Genre: K-pop
- Length: 25:56
- Label: SM; Universal

Girls' Generation-TTS chronology
Twinkle (2012)	Holler (2014)

Girls' Generation chronology
The Boys (2011)	Twinkle (2012)	Girls & Peace (2012)

Singles from Twinkle
- 1. "Twinkle" Released: April 29, 2012

Twinkle is the debut EP by the South Korean girl group Girls' Generation-TTS, composed of Taeyeon, Tiffany, and Seohyun. It was released digitally on April 29, 2012, and physically on May 2, 2012, by SM Entertainment.

== Background and release ==
On April 19, 2012, SM Entertainment announced the creation of Girls' Generation-TTS, as the first official subgroup of the 9-member South Korean girl group, Girls' Generation. They said in a statement, "This subgroup will aim to grab the attention of fans with all aspects of music, performance, and fashion styles.". The release of Twinkle was also confirmed in the same press release. The title track, having the same name, "Twinkle", was released simultaneously through iTunes for the global market, which included a special photo booklet that was different from its offline release.

== Promotion and critical reception ==
Professional ratings
Review scores
Source	Rating
AllMusic	4/5 stars

The group started off their promotional activities on Mnet's M Countdown on May 3, then subsequently also performed on various other South Korean music shows, such as KBS's Music Bank, MBC's Show! Music Core, and SBS's Inkigayo. They participated at the KBS's "Hello and Open Concert" during the same month. In the last week of promotions, Girls' Generation's Sooyoung performed a solo dance for her bandmates on their Music Core goodbye stage, while Hyoyeon, another Girls' Generation's member, performed a dance as well on Inkigayo with her Dancing with the Stars's dance partner. On June 5, 2012, the video of the group's second single "OMG (Oh My God)", was released.

AllMusic gave Twinkle a four out of five stars review. The single "Twinkle" was ranked number 14 on David Bevan's list of top 20 K-pop songs of 2012 for Spin.

== Chart performance ==
Twinkle reached #126 on the Billboard Top 200 Chart by selling over 3,000 copies, creating the record for the highest peaking K-pop album on the chart at the time The album also reached #1 on the Billboard World Albums and #2 on the Billboard Heatseekers Albums. As of October 2016, the album has sold over 160,000 copies in South Korea.

"Twinkle" peaked at number 1 on the Gaon Digital Chart and number 2 on Billboard's K-Pop Hot 100. The song had over 604,870 downloads during its first week of release, winning the Gaon Chart's top spot for the week's downloads. As of July 2014, it has sold more than 2,520,485 digital downloads in South Korea.

== Singles ==
"Twinkle" was released as the subgroup's first single on April 29, 2012. It was written and produced by Brandon Fraley, Jamelle Fraley, and Javier Solis, under their production team, Jam Factory. It was recorded at Sunset Blvd Studios in Nashville, Tennessee. The song is a dance-pop track with influences of funk, electropop and go-go, drawing inspiration from music during the 1970s and 1980s, specifically that of Stevie Wonder.

=== Music video ===
The video was released on April 30. It starts off with Taeyeon, Tiffany, and Seohyun getting out of a car with the instrumental of "OMG" (Oh My God) playing in the background, whilst a large amount of paparazzi are taking photos as they greet and smile to the cameras. One of the paparazzi is EXO-K member Park Chan-yeol. Rock singer Jung Joon-young could also be seen here as one of the paparazzi. After making their way through the paparazzi, they turn and begin to sing, while raising each arm, making all but one of the paparazzi follow their every move. Taeyeon then leads the girls though a hallway in new outfits, where they dance, and continue on. The video then cuts to Tiffany in a dressing room chair, holding a dog and being offered clothes by different women, next Seohyun begins to walk towards the camera as women all hold up different pairs of shoes for her to choose. The three girls then sit down and have women apply makeup as they continue singing. Next, Tiffany, Taeyeon, and Seohyun are seen sitting with EXO-K member Baekhyun as they chat and get ready. Seohyun whispers something funny to Tiffany and they finish getting ready.

Tiffany then leads the girls as they continue their walk through a hallway and are passed by EXO-K members Sehun and Kai, who then high-five each other after dancing with Tiffany. They are then shown on a stage where they sing into microphones and dance, a curtain appears. When it parts, Seohyun is on the building's roof, with a grand piano and a lit-up sign saying "Girls' Generation Twinkle" behind her. Tiffany and Taeyeon descend down the stairs on either side before it cuts to them with their backup dancers on the roof and on the stage. As the song finishes, "안녕" (Goodbye, Hello) starts playing, and the video cuts back to the paparazzi outside, who react when one of the front doors open, assuming it's one of the girls. But after they rush up, they find out it was only the dog that Tiffany was holding earlier. The camera pans up to the roof, where the three girls are looking down and laughing.

In an interview with Joon Park and Brian Joo on October 3, 2024, Tiffany shared that she directed the music video.

== Track listing ==
Credits adapted from Naver

Twinkle
No.	Title	Lyrics	Music	Arrangement	Length
1.	"Twinkle"	Seo Ji-eum	Brandon Fraley; Jamelle Fraley; Javier Solis	Sunset Blvd. Tracking Crew	3:28
2.	"Baby Steps"	Yoon Kyung (Joy Factory)	Jimmy Andrew Richard; Sean Alexander (Avenue 52); Tom Roger Rogstad; Jimmy Burney; Joachim "Kleen" Alte	Jimmy Andrew Richard; Sean Alexander (Avenue 52); Tom Roger Rogstad; Jimmy Burney; Joachim "Kleen" Alte	3:56
3.	"OMG" (Oh My God)	Kim Jeong-bae	Kenzie	Kenzie	3:25
4.	"Library"	Jo Yoon-kyung	Sharon Vaughn; Didrik Thott; Sebastian Thott	Hitchhiker	4:03
5.	"Good-bye, Hello" (Korean: 안녕; RR: Annyeong)	Kim Boo-min	Hitchhiker	Hitchhiker	3:52
6.	"Love Sick" (Korean: 처음이었죠; RR: Cheo-eumieotjyo; lit. First Time)	Eden Kang	Hwang Chan-hee	Hwang Chan-hee; Peejay	3:26
7.	"Checkmate" (Korean: 체크메이트; RR: Chekeumeiteu)	Kim Boo-min	Hitchhiker	Hitchhiker	3:27
Total length:					25:37

== Personnel ==
Credits are adapted from AllMusic.

- Sean Alexander – Arranger
- Joachim Alte – Arranger
- Beat Burger – Choreographer, Direction
- Jimmy Burney – Arranger
- Dave Cleveland – Guitar
- George Cochinni – Guitar
- Steve Dady – Engineer
- Hitchhiker – Arranger, Bass, Direction, Guitar, Keyboards, Programming
- Greg Hwang – Choreographer, Direction
- Kenzie – Arranger, Direction, Keyboards, Vocal Director
- Kim Young-Hu – Engineer, Vocal Director
- Kim Young-Min – Executive Supervision
- Lee Soo-Man – Executive Producer
- Steven Muynkyu Lee – English Supervision
- Gary Lunn – Bass
- Jimmy Andrew Richard – Arranger
- Jeff Roach – Keyboards
- Tom Roger – Arranger
- Lee Sung Sil – Assistant Engineer
- Jae Sim – Choreographer, Direction
- Sunset Blvd. Tracking Crew – Arranger
- TST – Brass
- Scott Williamson – Drums
- Girls' Generation-TTS – Vocals, Background Vocals, Styling

== Charts ==
=== Weekly charts ===
Chart (2012)	Peak position
Japanese Oricon Albums Chart	6
South Korean Gaon Album Chart	1
Taiwanese G-Music Chart	5
US Billboard 200	126
US Billboard Heatseekers Album	2
US Billboard World Albums	1

=== Year-end charts ===
Chart (2012)	Position
South Korean Gaon Album Chart	8

== Awards and nominations ==
=== Music programs awards ===
Song	Program	Date
"Twinkle"	MBC Music's Show Champion	May 8, 2012
"Twinkle"	MBC Music's Show Champion	May 15, 2012
"Twinkle"	MBC Music's Show Champion	May 22, 2012
"Twinkle"	Mnet's M Countown	May 10, 2012
"Twinkle"	Mnet's M Countown	May 17, 2012
"Twinkle"	Mnet's M Countown	May 24, 2012
"Twinkle"	KBS's Music Bank	May 11, 2012
"Twinkle"	KBS's Music Bank	May 18, 2012
"Twinkle"	KBS's Music Bank	May 25, 2012
"Twinkle"	SBS's Inkigayo	May 13, 2012
"Twinkle"	SBS's Inkigayo	May 20, 2012
"Twinkle"	SBS's Inkigayo	May 27, 2012

== Release history ==
Country	Date	Format	Distributor
Worldwide	April 29, 2012	Digital download	SM
South Korea	May 2, 2012	Compact disc	SM; KMP Holdings
Hong Kong	May 25, 2012	Compact disc	Universal
Taiwan	June 8, 2012	Compact disc	Universal
