= Girls' Generation-TTS =

South Korean girl group

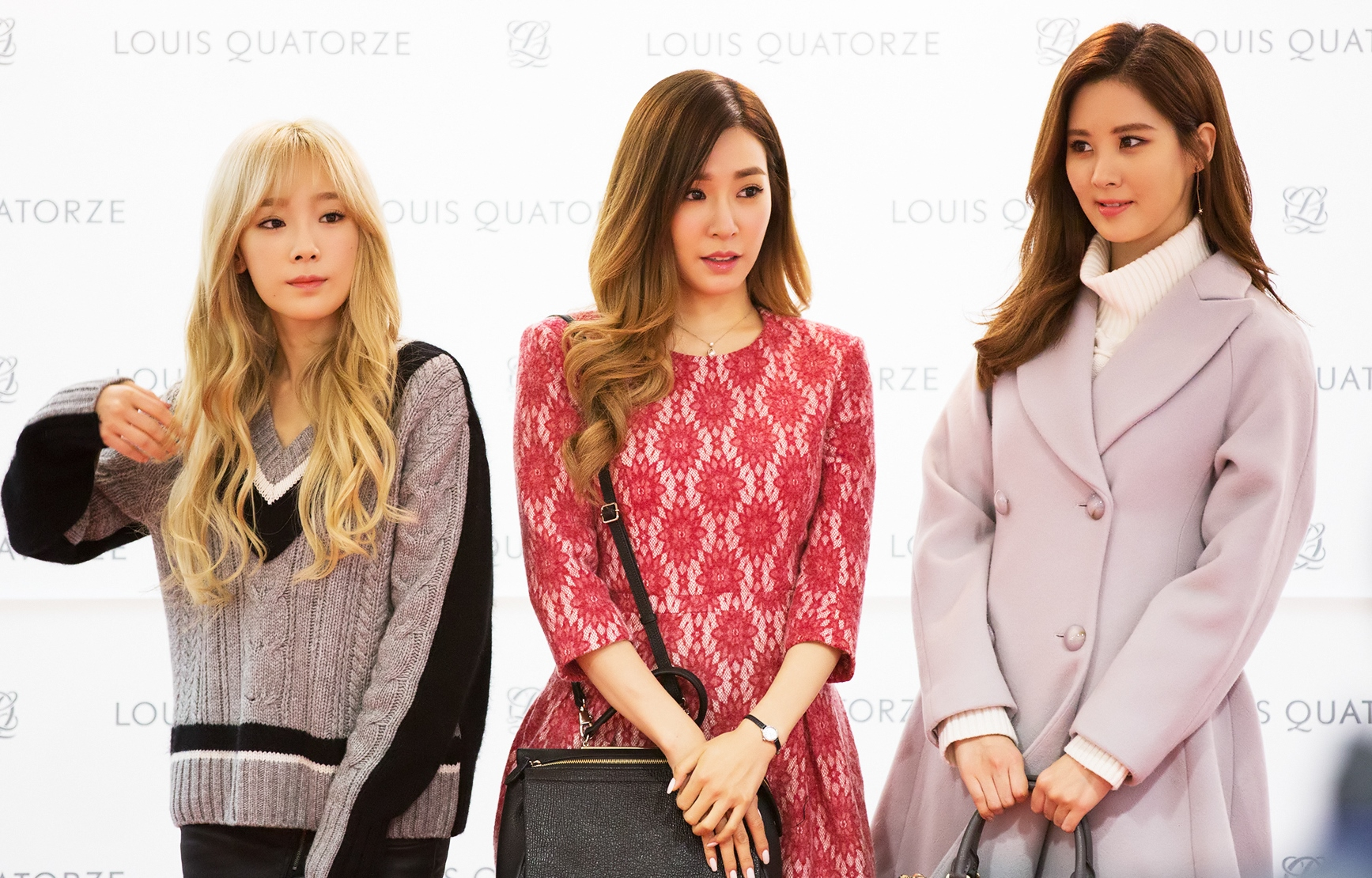
- TaeTiSeo at a fan signing event for Louis Quatorze in November 2015; From left to right: Taeyeon, Tiffany, and Seohyun

Background information
- Origin: Seoul, South Korea
- Genres: K-pop; dance-pop; electropop
- Years active: 2012–2017 (Note: Indefinite hiatus)
- Label: SM
- Spinoff of: Girls' Generation
- Members: Taeyeon; Tiffany; Seohyun
- Website: Official website

Girls' Generation-TTS (Korean: 소녀시대-태티서, also known as TTS, TaeTiSeo, or Girls' Generation-TaeTiSeo) is the first sub-unit of South Korean girl group Girls' Generation, formed by SM Entertainment in 2012. It is composed of three Girls' Generation members: Taeyeon, Tiffany, and Seohyun. The sub-group has released three extended plays: Twinkle, Holler, and Dear Santa.

== History ==
During the year 2012, South Korean girl group Girls' Generation went through an unannounced hiatus as the majority of the group's members were focusing on individual activities. Some acted in television dramas while others participated in various television programs. The subgroup TTS was born because members Taeyeon, Tiffany, and Seohyun wanted to carry on with their music activities. All three were hosts of the weekly music program Show! Music Core at the time. On April 19, 2012, SM Entertainment officially announced the formation of the subgroup and hinted at the possibility of other future subgroups, explaining, "the members of the unit [are rotated] according to the [unique] music and concept of each new subgroup album." Compared to Girls' Generation, TTS's main focus is on each member's vocal ability while the original group places more emphasis on the overall songs and uniform group performances. The name "TaeTiSeo" or "TTS", is made up of the first syllables of Taeyeon, Tiffany, and Seohyun.

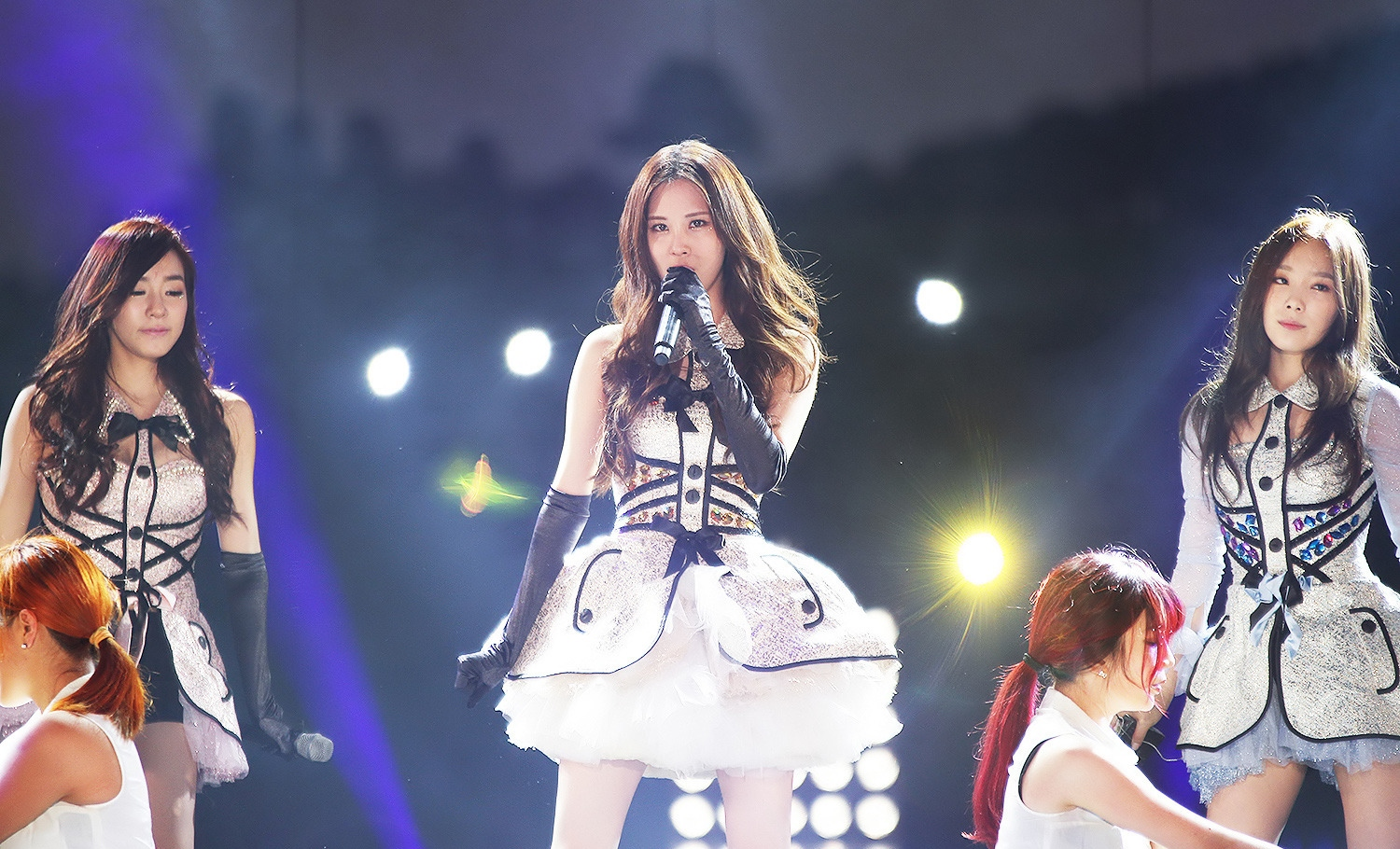
TaeTiSeo at Suncheon Bay Garden Expo International K-POP Concert in 2013.

Their debut EP, Twinkle, was released on April 30, 2012. It was the first album by a Korean artist to rank number 1 on the Billboard World Albums chart. At the time, it was also the highest charting K-pop album on the Billboard 200, reaching number 126. The title track of the same name sold 2,520,485 digital copies in South Korea as of July 2014, and the album has sold 155,521 copies in South Korea. TTS became the first subgroup to achieve a "triple crown" on South Korean music shows, reigning in the number 1 spot for three weeks in a row.

In September 2014, the group released their second EP, Holler, selling 87,513 copies. The album debuted at number 1 on South Korea's Gaon Album Chart and the Billboard World Albums chart. With this achievement, TTS become the third Korean artist, and the first female artist, to have more than one number 1 on the Billboard World Albums chart. During an interview with Billboard, the three singers shared, "This album was really personal for us and it was fun ... to put out a much more raw side of our music ... the music we put together has so much more layers, so much more depth to it in terms of sound, choruses or harmonizing together ... Our main goal was to not be visually entertaining, but be vocally entertaining." They also revealed that Seohyun wrote the lyrics to one of the songs, "Only U", while Tiffany served as the visual director to the concept of "Holler" music video. During promotions, the three singers were featured in the reality show The TaeTiSeo. The show took on the personal side of Taeyeon, Tiffany and Seohyun, revealing how they live their normal everyday lives and what they do in their free time. Some footage of the album preparation was also shown.

In December 2015, TTS released their third EP, a Christmas special album titled Dear Santa. The album debuted at number 2 on South Korea's Gaon Albums Chart and has sold at least 60,456 copies to date. Seohyun wrote the lyrics to the title track "Dear Santa". As an effort to support music education for children in Asia, TTS contributed a part of the album's sales profits to a charity called "SMile for U", a campaign held between SM Entertainment and UNICEF.

== Discography ==
=== Extended plays ===
Title	Album details	Peak chart positions					Sales
Title	Album details	KOR	JPN	US	US World	US Heat.	Sales
Twinkle	Released: April 29, 2012; Label: SM Entertainment; Formats: CD, digital download	1	6	126	1	2	KOR: 164,621; JPN: 27,768; US: 3,000
Holler	Released: September 16, 2014; Label: SM Entertainment; Formats: CD, digital download	1	23	—	1	11	KOR: 97,969; JPN: 12,758
Dear Santa	Released: December 4, 2015; Label: SM Entertainment; Formats: CD, digital download	2	25	—	4	14	KOR: 65,894; JPN: 7,845
"—" denotes releases that did not chart or were not released in that region.

=== Singles ===
Title	Year	Peak chart positions			Sales (DL)	Album
Title	Year	KOR	KOR Hot	US World	Sales (DL)	Album
"Twinkle"	2012	1	2	4	KOR: 2,528,880	Twinkle
"Whisper" (내가 네게)	2014	4	—	—	KOR: 346,386	Holler
"Holler"	2014	3	—	6	KOR: 466,694	Holler
"Dear Santa"	2015	7	—	7	KOR: 486,713	Dear Santa
"—" denotes songs that did not chart.

=== Other charted songs ===
Title	Year	Peak chart positions		Album
Title	Year	KOR	KOR Hot	Album
"Baby Steps"	2012	15	22	Twinkle
"OMG (Oh My God)"	2012	26	44	Twinkle
"Library"	2012	33	75	Twinkle
"Goodbye, Hello" (안녕)	2012	32	59	Twinkle
"Love Sick" (처음이었죠)	2012	28	58	Twinkle
"Checkmate" (체크메이트)	2012	44	89	Twinkle
"Adrenaline" (아드레날린)	2014	42	—	Holler
"Only U"	2014	51	—	Holler
"Stay"	2014	69	—	Holler
"Eyes"	2014	75	—	Holler
"Merry Christmas"	2015	29	—	Dear Santa
"Winter Story" (겨울을 닮은 너)	2015	41	—	Dear Santa
"First Snow" (첫눈처럼)	2015	51	—	Dear Santa
"I Like the Way"	2015	57	—	Dear Santa
"—" denotes songs that did not chart.

== Filmography ==
=== Television ===
Year	Title	Note
2014	The TaeTiSeo	Reality show

=== Music videos ===
Title	Year	Director
"Twinkle"	2012	Unknown
"OMG (Oh My God)"	2012	Unknown
"Holler"	2014	Hong Won-ki
"Dear Santa"	2015	Unknown
"Dear Santa" (English ver.)	2015	Unknown

== Awards and nominations ==
Name of the award ceremony, year presented, category, nominee of the award, and the result of the nomination
Award ceremony	Year	Category	Nominee / Work	Result	Ref.
Gaon Chart K-Pop Awards	2013	Album of the Year – 2nd Quarter	Twinkle	Won	
Gaon Chart K-Pop Awards	2013	Song of the Year – May	"Twinkle"	Won	
Golden Disc Awards	2013	Disk Daesang	Twinkle	Nominated	
Golden Disc Awards	2013	Digital Daesang	Twinkle	Nominated	
Golden Disc Awards	2013	Popularity Award	Girls' Generation-TTS	Nominated	
Golden Disc Awards	2015	Disk Bonsang	Holler	Won	
Golden Disc Awards	2015	Disk Daesang	Holler	Nominated	
Melon Music Awards	2012	Top 10 Artist	"Twinkle"	Nominated	
Mnet 20's Choice Awards	2012	20's Trendy Music	Girls' Generation-TTS	Won	
Mnet Asian Music Awards	2012	Best Female Group	Girls' Generation-TTS	Nominated	
Mnet Asian Music Awards	2012	Best Global Group	Girls' Generation-TTS	Nominated	
Mnet Asian Music Awards	2012	Artist of the Year	Girls' Generation-TTS	Nominated	
Mnet Asian Music Awards	2014	Youku-Tudou Best Music Video	"Holler"	Nominated	
Mnet Asian Music Awards	2014	K-Pop Fan's Choice – Female	Girls' Generation-TTS	Won	
SBS MTV Best of the Best	2012	Best Global	Girls' Generation-TTS	Nominated	
SBS MTV Best of the Best	2012	Artist of the Year	Girls' Generation-TTS	Nominated	
SBS MTV Best of the Best	2014	Best Female Video	"Holler"	Nominated	
Seoul Music Awards	2013	Bonsang Award	"Twinkle"	Nominated	
Seoul Music Awards	2013	Popularity Award	"Twinkle"	Nominated	
Seoul Music Awards	2015	Bonsang Award	Holler	Won	
Seoul Music Awards	2015	Daesang Award	Holler	Nominated	
Style Icon Awards	2014	Top 10 Style Icons	Girls' Generation-TTS	Won	
