= 2013 YouTube Music Awards =

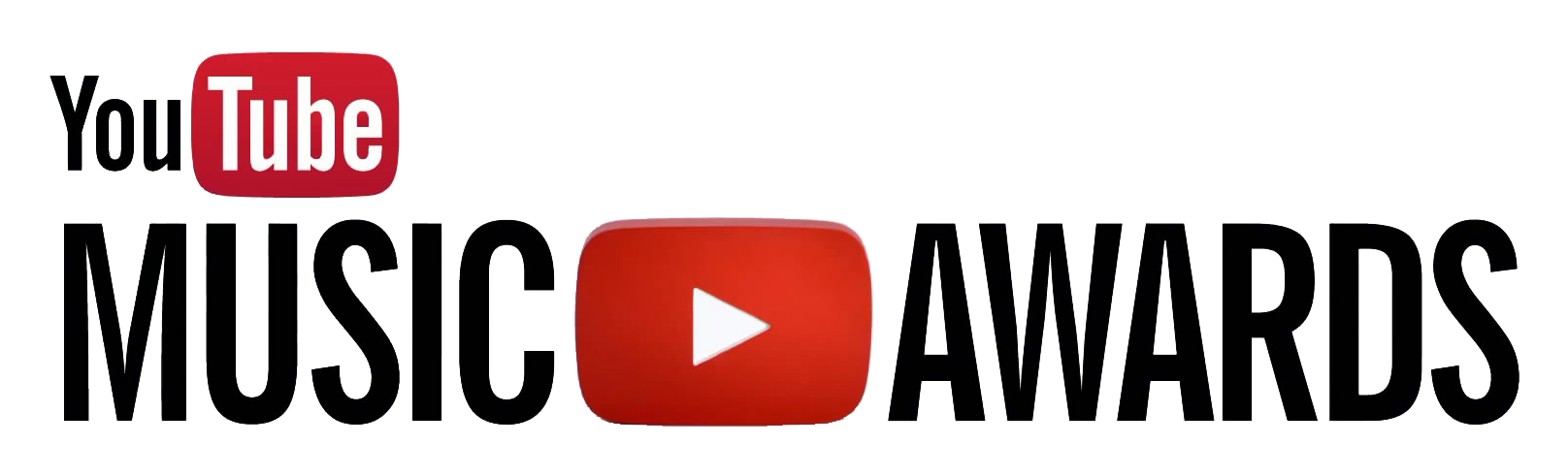
- Sponsored by: Kia
- Date: Sunday, November 3, 2013
- Location: Pier 36, New York City
- Hosted by: Jason Schwartzman and Reggie Watts and Vanessa Hudgens

Television/radio coverage
- Network: YouTube

The 2013 YouTube Music Awards, abbreviated as the YTMA, was the inaugural music award show presented by YouTube. The inaugural award show was held on November 3, 2013, streamed live from Pier 36 in New York City, with additional shows in Seoul, Moscow, Rio de Janeiro, and London.

Unlike other award shows, the winners were entirely voted on by fans. The show was directed by Spike Jonze.

"None of us have done anything live before or an awards show – in a way we're all like amateurs on YouTube ourselves, making our first video. So even if it's messy, it'll be live," Jonze admitted to Billboard.com.

== Announcement and promotion ==
On September 30, 2013, YouTube uploaded Announcing the first-ever YouTube Music Awards, on its own channel. The video revealed that the award show would be presented by Kia. Several of the nominees, such as Epic Rap Battles of History and Eminem promoted their videos, in hopes they would win. Innovation of the Year nominee, DeStorm Power, also made a video asking his fans to vote for him stating,

"Let's bring one home, and keep it in the family,"

referring to the fact that he is considered a homegrown YouTube musician. Kia served as the event's main sponsor.

== Live performances and streaming ==
The award show featured live performances in the form of music videos from music industry stars such as Lady Gaga, Eminem, Arcade Fire, and Avicii. The award show was live streamed on YouTube's official channel.

Artist	Song	Director(s)	Live Show Director(s)	HMU Department Head
Arcade Fire	"Afterlife"	Spike Jonze	John Gonzalez	Juliet Silva Yee
CDZA; Walk off the Earth	"Abridged History of YouTube Music" medley: 1. "Here It Goes Again" - OK Go; 2. "Chocolate Rain" (feat. Tay Zonday); 3. "Single Ladies" - Beyoncé; 4. "Born This Way" - Lady Gaga; 5. "Party Rock Anthem" - LMFAO ft. Lauren Bennett and GoonRock; 6. "Bed Intruder Song" - Antoine Dodson & The Gregory Brothers ft. Kelly Dodson; 7. "I'm On A Boat" - The Lonely Island ft. T-Pain (feat. T-Pain); with Walk of the Earth: 1. "Somebody That I Used to Know" - Gotye ft. Kimbra; 2. "Call Me Maybe" - Carly Rae Jepsen; 3. "Friday" - Rebecca Black; 4. "TiK ToK" - Kesha; 5. "Thrift Shop" - Macklemore & Ryan Lewis ft. Wanz; 6. "Gangnam Style" - PSY; 7. "The Fox (What Does the Fox Say?)" - Ylvis	Joe Sabia (creator)		
Lady Gaga	"Dope"	Spike Jonze; Chris Milk		
Earl Sweatshirt; Tyler, the Creator	"Sasquatch"	Wolf Haley (creator)		
Lindsey Stirling	"Crystallize"	Ray Tintori (creator)		
Avicii	"Hey Brother" "You Make Me" "Wake Me Up"	Spike Jonze; Chris Milk; Lena Dunham (writer)		Juliet Silva Yee; Maisha Teacher; Angelina Avallone (Makeup + Hair Design)
M.I.A.	"Come Walk With Me"	Fafi (creator)		
Eminem	"Rap God"	Syndrome (creator)		

== Winners and nominees ==
On Monday, October 21, 2013, YouTube announced the nominees for the six categories of its inaugural music award show. The nominees are based on video views, likes, comments, and subscriptions since September 2012. However, YouTube has not yet published the final stats results on the votes. Girls' Generation won the Video of the Year with "I Got a Boy".

=== Video of the Year ===
Video of the Year recognizes the video with most fan engagement based on views, likes, shares, and comments.

Girls' Generation — "I Got a Boy"

- Demi Lovato — "Heart Attack"
  Epic Rap Battles of History — "Barack Obama vs. Mitt Romney"
  Justin Bieber ft. Nicki Minaj — "Beauty and a Beat"
  Lady Gaga — "Applause"
  Macklemore & Ryan Lewis ft. Mary Lambert — "Same Love"
  Miley Cyrus — "We Can't Stop"
  One Direction — "Best Song Ever"
  PSY – "Gentleman"
  Selena Gomez — "Come & Get It"

=== Artist of the Year ===
Artist of the Year recognizes the most watched, shared, liked, and subscribed-to artists.

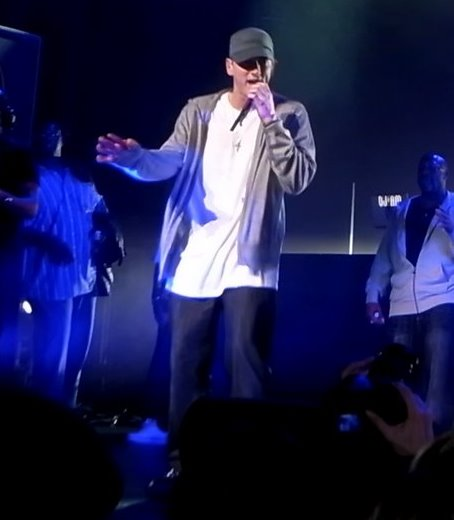
Eminem won Artist of the Year, and performed "Rap God" to close the award show.

Eminem

- Epic Rap Battles of History
- Justin Bieber
- Katy Perry
- Macklemore & Ryan Lewis
- Nicki Minaj
- One Direction
- PSY
- Rihanna
- Taylor Swift

=== Response of the Year ===
Response of the Year recognizes the best fan remixes, covers or parodies, based on views, likes, shares, and comments.

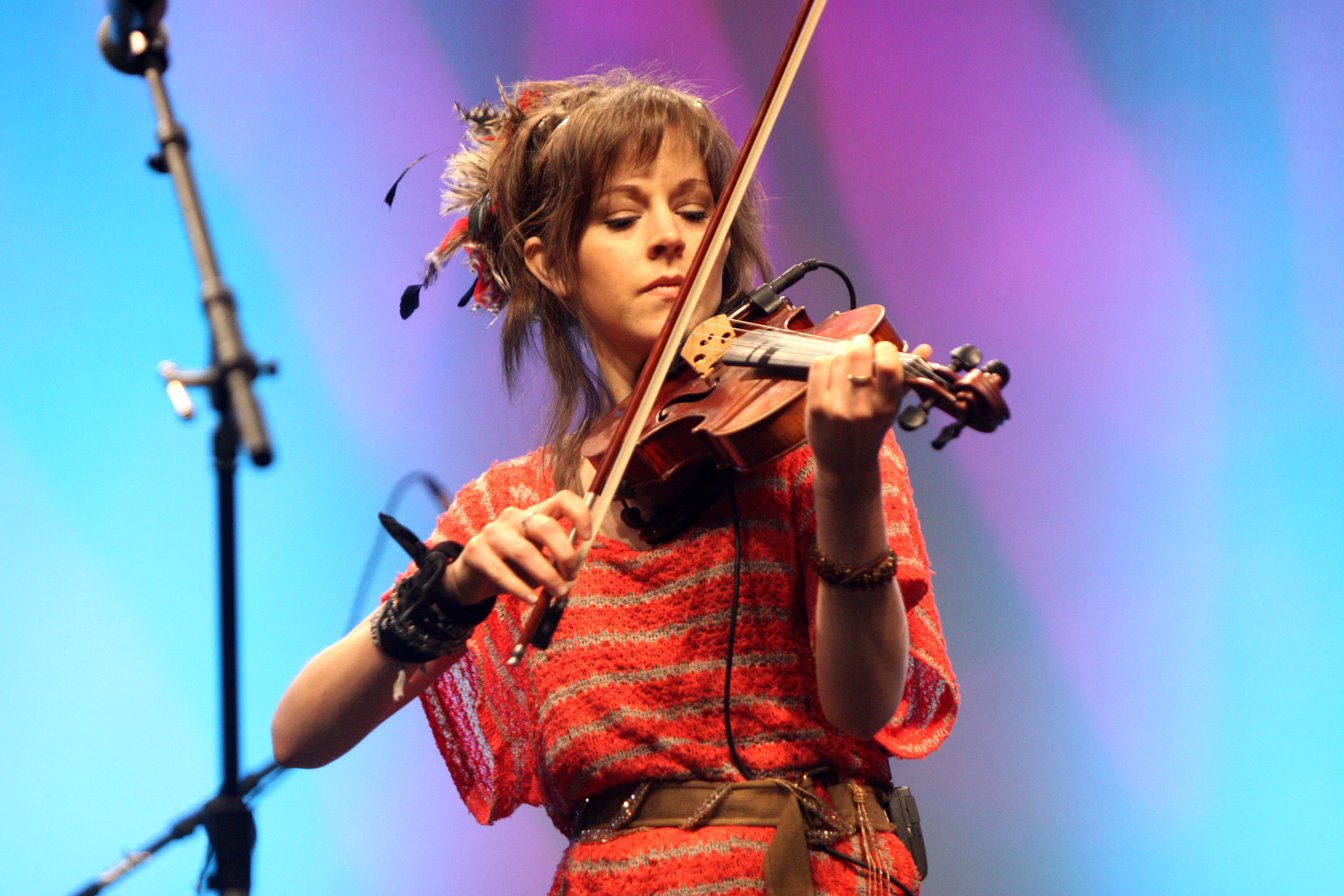
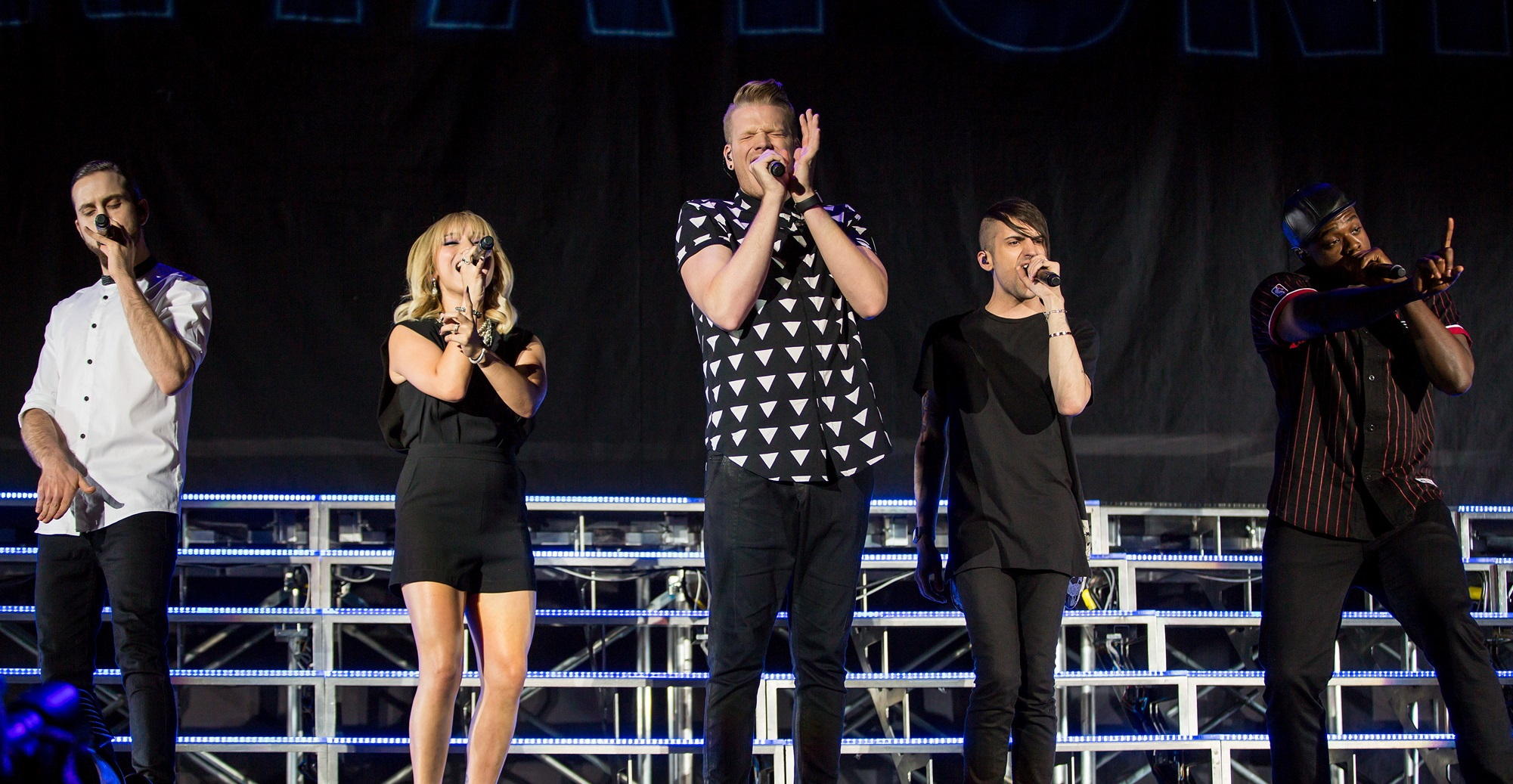
Lindsey Stirling, along with Pentatonix won Response of the Year.

Lindsey Stirling and Pentatonix – "Radioactive"

- Boyce Avenue (feat. Fifth Harmony) – "Mirrors"
  Jayesslee – "Gangnam Style"
  ThePianoGuys – "Titanium / Pavane"
  Walk Off the Earth (feat. KRNFX) – "I Knew You Were Trouble"

=== YouTube Phenomenon ===
Recognizing the songs that generated the most fan videos.

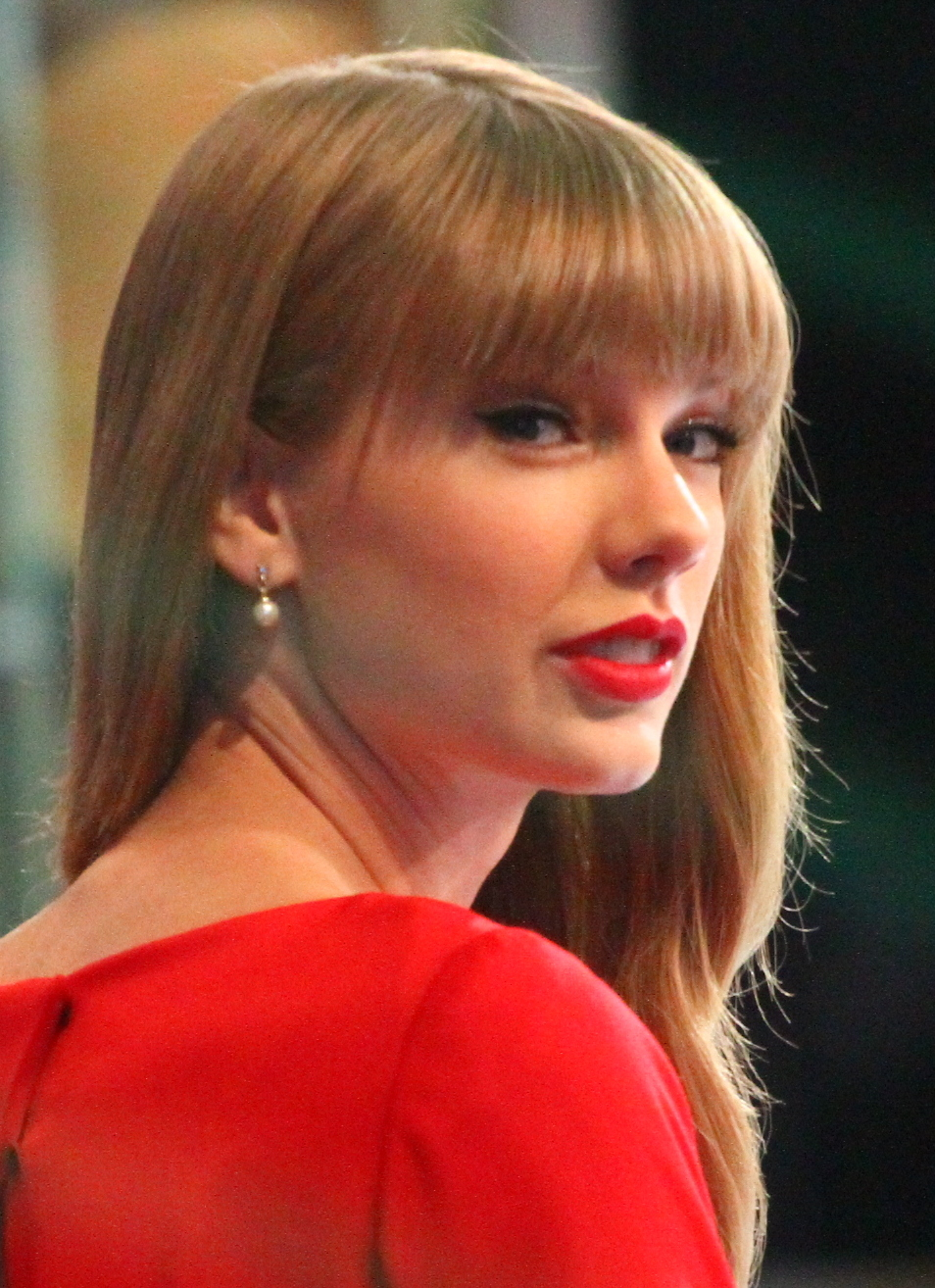
Taylor Swift's "I Knew You Were Trouble" won YouTube Phenomenon

"I Knew You Were Trouble"

- "Diamonds"
- "Gangnam Style"
- "Harlem Shake"
- "Thrift Shop"

=== YouTube Breakthrough ===
Recognizing the artists with the greatest growth in views and subscribers.

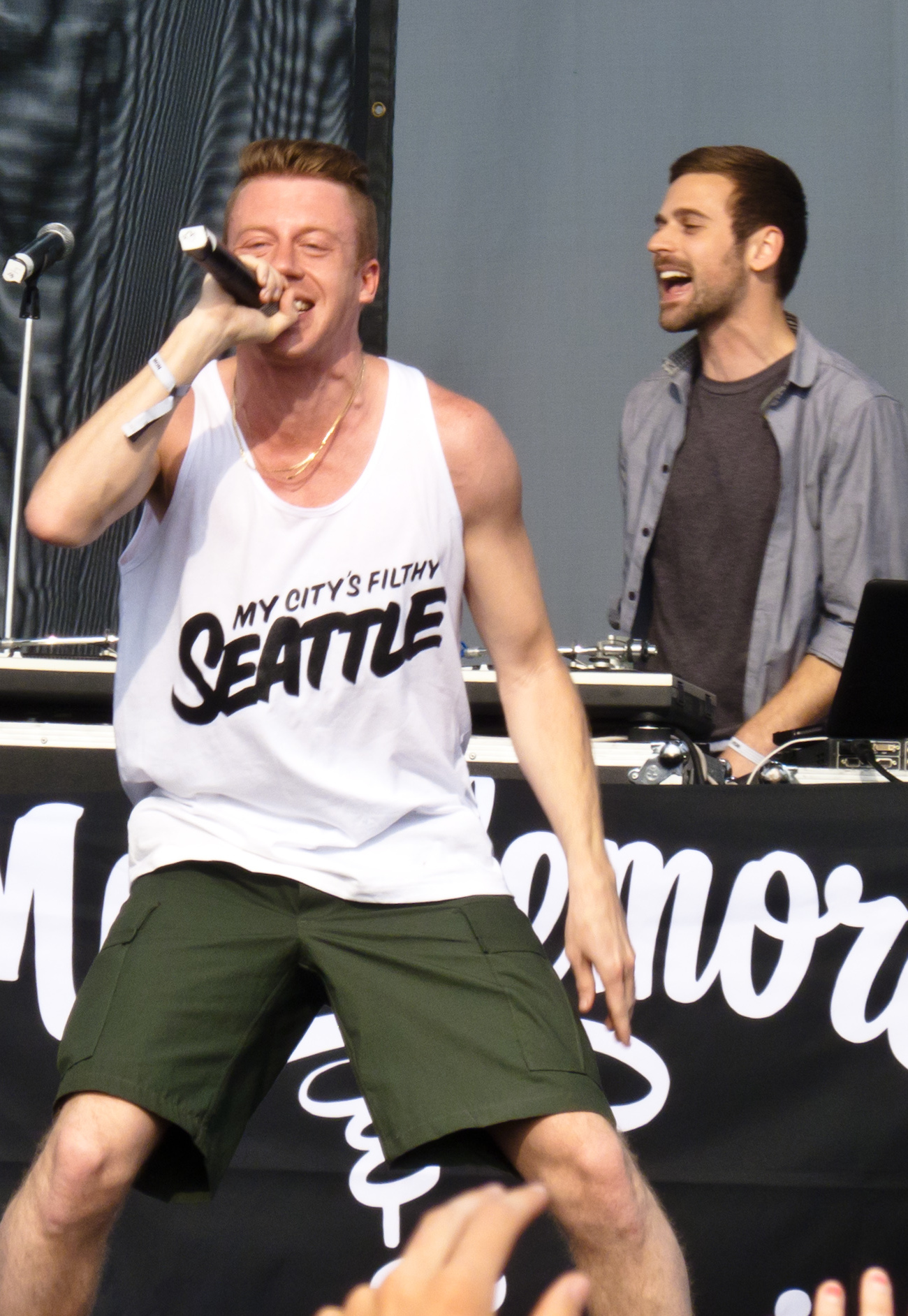
Macklemore & Ryan Lewis won YouTube Breakthrough

Macklemore & Ryan Lewis

- Kendrick Lamar
- Naughty Boy
- Passenger
- Rudimental

=== Innovation of the Year ===
Innovation of the Year recognizes creative video innovations with the most views, likes, shares and comments.

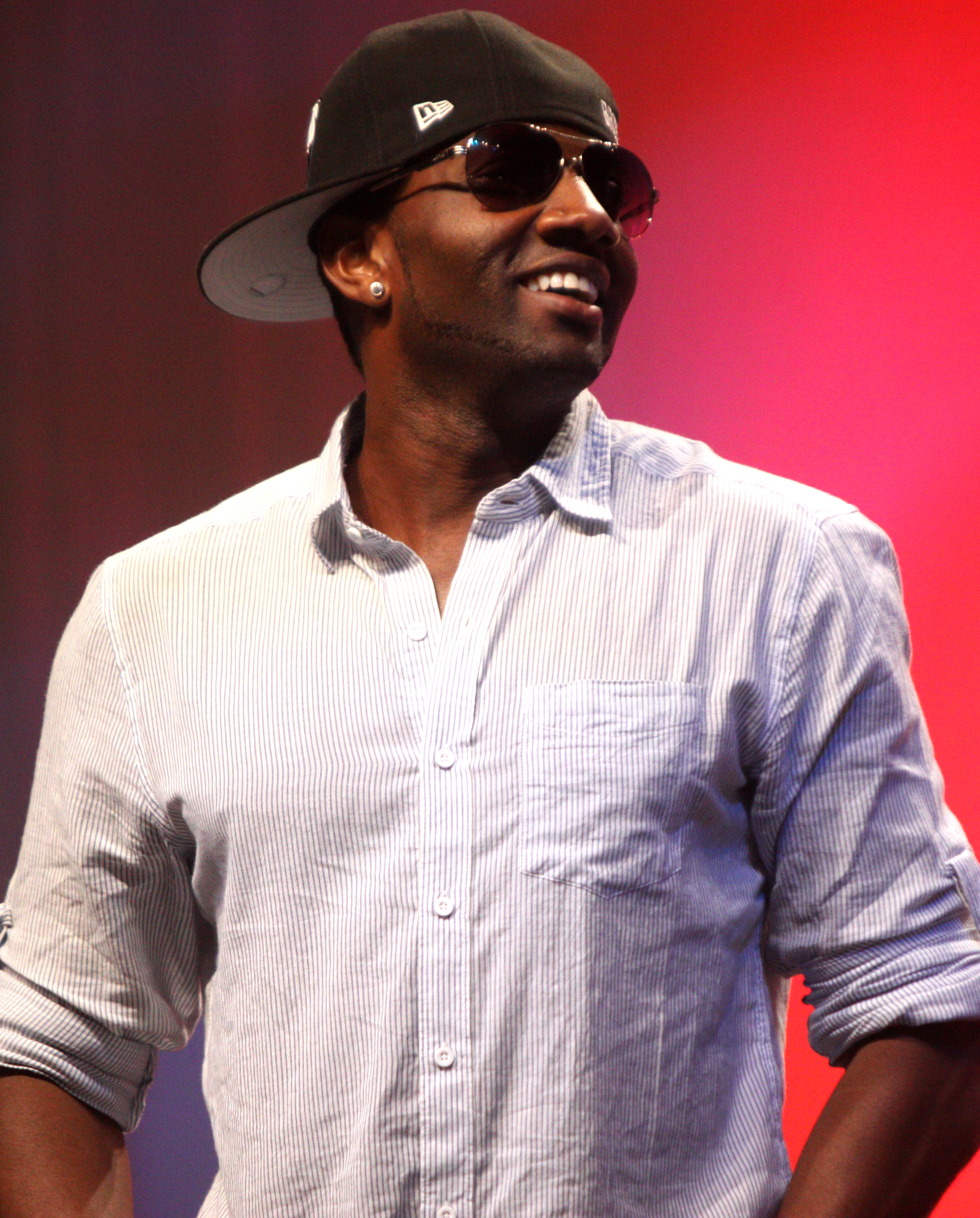
DeStorm Power, winner of Innovation of the Year

DeStorm – "See Me Standing"

- Anamanaguchi – "Endless Fantasy"
  Atoms for Peace – "Ingenue"
  Bat For Lashes – "Lilies"
  Toro Y Moi – "Say That"

== Reception ==
The show was documented for being unusual compared to other award shows, as well as having moments of awkward pauses and brief technical difficulties. Eminem's victory of Artist of the Year was, perhaps, the pinnacle of the feeling that the YouTube Music Awards' nominees were puzzling. This is because a frequent criticism was that being the YouTube Music Awards, homegrown YouTube musicians should have been more frequently nominated than they were. The Los Angeles Times stated,

"He is hardly a YouTube sensation in the traditional sense. He's more of an MTV kind of guy. Shouldn't YouTube try harder to honor its own?",

referring to Eminem and his victory at the YTMAs.

Attendee and performer Tyler, the Creator, was also critical of the awards, noting the mainstream artist presence rather than independent YouTube musicians.

Yahoo! News stated,

"The 90-minute affair may have split the Internet audience down the middle, judging by comments posted on Twitter, in which some people complained of censorship, when the show's live stream stopped several times."

YouTube disabling comments on the video of the award show was also heavily criticized by fans.

Additionally, Girls' Generation, the Video of the Year's winner, received a considerable amount of negative backlash on Twitter from fans of the other candidates. Another winner, DeStorm, had his name mispronounced by hosts as he accepted his award. This was used as an example in a common criticism of the ceremony, which was that YouTube pushed its own content creators aside in favor of more traditional celebrities.
