= Dear Santa (EP) =

EP by Girls' Generation-TTS
- Released: December 4, 2015
- Recorded: 2015
- Studios: SM (Seoul); Doobdoob (Seoul); In Grid (Seoul)
- Genres: Dance-pop; disco; R&B; swing jazz
- Length: 21:26
- Languages: Korean; English
- Label: SM

Girls' Generation-TTS chronology
Holler (2014)	Dear Santa (2015)

Girls' Generation chronology
Lion Heart (2015)	Dear Santa (2015)	Holiday Night (2017)

Singles from Dear Santa
- 1. "Dear Santa" Released: December 4, 2015; 2. "Winter Story" Released: December 11, 2015

Dear Santa is the Christmas EP (third overall) by Girls' Generation-TTS, sub-unit of the South Korean girl group Girls' Generation. It was released digitally and physically on December 4, 2015, by SM Entertainment.

== Background and release ==
After releasing their 2nd EP, Holler, in 2014, Girls' Generation-TTS aimed to put out their next release a Christmas special album. They wanted to have a more comfortable and warm concept compared to their previous releases. Members Taeyeon and Tiffany proceeded to start on the album preparation in February 2015. Later on, member Seohyun participated in writing the Korean lyrics for the album's title song, "Dear Santa". In an interview, member Tiffany has said that the group wanted to put together an album that would "accentuate" their vocals. The album was released on December 4, 2015, with six tracks. The title song, "Dear Santa" was released in both English and Korean languages. As an effort to support music education for children in Asia, the group contributed a part of the album's sales profits to a charity called "SMile for U", a campaign held between SM Entertainment and UNICEF.

== Singles ==
The title track "Dear Santa" was described to have mixed genres, including ballad and R&B melodies as well as a combination of upbeat and swing jazz sounds. Lyrically, it talks about a woman making wishes to Santa Claus, hoping to work things out with her boyfriend to spend Christmas time together. Fuse ranked the song as one among their lists of "Best Holiday Songs of 2015" and "K-pop's 25 Best Christmas Songs".

"Winter Story" was described to have a guitar-led sound that brings out Girls' Generation-TTS's "soulful" vocals. A live acoustic version of the song was released on December 11, 2015.

Professional ratings
Review scores
Source	Rating
IZM	3/5 stars
The Star	5/10

== Promotion ==
Girls' Generation-TTS performed the title track "Dear Santa" and other side tracks on KBS's Music Bank, MBC's Music Core, and SBS's Inkigayo.

== Track listing ==
Credits adapted from Naver

Dear Santa
No.	Title	Lyrics	Music	Arrangement	Length
1.	"Dear Santa"	Seohyun; Lee Seu-ran	Simon Petrén; Andreas Öberg; Gustav Karlström; Maja Keuc	Simon Petrén; Gustav Karlström	3:58
2.	"I Like the Way"	Jeon Ji-eun (January 8th (lalala Studio)); Hwang Seon-jeong (January 8th (lalala Studio)); Kim Jeong-mi (January 8th (lalala Studio))	Bardur Haberg; Courtney Jenaé Stahl; Nermin Harambašić; Anne Judith Wik; Ronny Svendsen; Charite Viken	Bardur Haberg; Nermin Harambašić	3:11
3.	"Winter Story" (Korean: 겨울을 닮은 너; RR: Gyeo-uleul Dalmeun; lit. 'Winter-like')	Choi So-young	Jamie Jones (The Heavyweights); Matt Wong (The Heavyweights)	The Heavyweights	3:22
4.	"Merry Christmas"	Baek In-kyung (100% Lyricism); Jung Young-ah (100% Lyricism); Seo Seung-hee (100% Lyricism); Lee Seu-ran; Kim In-hyung	Matt Wong (The Heavyweights); Jamie Jones (The Heavyweights); Jack Kugell (The Heavyweights); Paulina Cerrilla	The Heavyweights	3:45
5.	"First Snow" (Korean: 첫눈처럼; RR: Cheonnuncheoreom; lit. 'Like the First Snow')	Mafly (Joombas)	Im Kwang-wook (Devine Channel); Ryan Kim (Devine Channel); Amanda Moseley (Devine Channel); Hunnykilla (Devine Channel); Im "Chase" Chae-seop (Devine Channel)	Devine Channel	3:13
6.	"Dear Santa" (English Version)	Simon Petrén; Andreas Öberg; Gustav Karlström; Maja Keuc	Simon Petrén; Andreas Öberg; Gustav Karlström; Maja Keuc	Simon Petrén; Gustav Karlström	3:58
Total length:					21:26

== Credits and personnel ==
Credits adapted from the EP's liner notes.

Studio

- SM Blue Ocean Studio – recording (track 1–2, 6), mixing (track 1, 4, 6)
- Doobdoob Studio – recording (track 1, 3, 6), additional vocal editing (track 5)
- In Grid Studio – recording (track 2, 4–5)
- SM Yellow Tail Studio – recording (track 3), mixing (track 2)
- SM Blue Cup Studio – recording, mixing (track 3)
- SM Concert Hall Studio – mixing (track 5)
- MonoTree Studio – Pro Tools operating (all tracks), additional vocal editing (track 1–4, 6)
- Sterling Sound – mastering (all tracks)

Personnel

- SM Entertainment – executive producer
- Lee Soo-man – producer
- Girls' Generation-TTS – vocals, background vocals (all tracks)
  - Seohyun – lyrics (track 1)
- Lee Seu-ran – lyrics (track 1, 4)
- Simon Petrén – lyrics (track 6), producer, composition, arrangement (track 1, 6)
- Andreas Öberg – lyrics (track 6), composition (track 1, 6)
- Gustav Karlström – lyrics, background vocals (track 6), producer, composition, arrangement (track 1, 6)
- Maja Keuc – lyrics (track 6), composition (track 1, 6)
- January 8th (lalala Studio) – lyrics (track 2)
- Bardur Haberg – producer, composition, arrangement (track 2)
- Courtney Jenaé Stahl – composition, background vocals (track 2)
- Nermin Harambašić – producer, composition, arrangement (track 2)
- Anne Judith Wik – composition, background vocals (track 2)
- Ronny Svendsen – composition (track 2)
- Charite Viken – composition (track 2)
- Choi So-young – lyrics (track 3)
- Jamie Jones (The Heavyweights) – producer, composition, arrangement, instrumentation (track 3–4)
- Matt Wong (The Heavyweights) – producer, composition, arrangement, instrumentation (track 3–4)
- 100% Lyricism – lyrics (track 4)
- Kim In-hyung – lyrics (track 4)
- Jack Kugell (The Heavyweights) – producer, composition, arrangement, instrumentation (track 4)
- Paulina Cerrilla – composition (track 4)
- Mafly (Joombas) – lyrics (track 5)
- Im Kwang-wook (Devine Channel) – producer, composition, arrangement (track 5)
- Ryan Kim (Devine Channel) – producer, composition, arrangement (track 5)
- Amanda Moseley (Devine Channel) – composition (track 5)
- Hunnykilla (Devine Channel) – composition (track 5)
- Im "Chase" Chae-seop (Devine Channel) – producer, composition, arrangement (track 5)
- Lee Joo-hyung (MonoTree) – vocal directing, Pro Tools operating, additional vocal editing (track 1, 6), background vocals (track 1)
- Hwang Hyun (MonoTree) – vocal directing, Pro Tools operating, additional vocal editing (track 2)
- G-High (MonoTree) – vocal directing, Pro Tools operating (track 3–5), additional vocal editing (track 3–4)
- Yoo Shin-hye – background vocals (track 4–5)
- Jukjae – guitar (track 1, 3, 6)
- Kim Cheol-sun – recording (track 1–2, 6), mixing (track 1, 4, 6)
- Jang Woo-young – recording (track 1, 3, 6), additional vocal editing (track 5)
- Jung Eun-kyung – recording (track 2, 4–5)
- Koo Jong-pil – recording (track 3), mixing (track 2)
- Jung Eui-seok – recording, mixing (track 3)
- Nam Koong-jin – mixing (track 5)
- Tom Coyne – mastering (all tracks)

== Charts ==
Chart (2015)	Peak position
South Korean Albums (Circle)	2
Japanese Albums (Oricon)	25
US World Albums (Billboard)	4

=== Year-end chart ===
Chart (2015)	Position
South Korea (Gaon)	42

== Sales ==
Country	Sales
South Korea (Gaon)	61,163

== Release history ==
Region	Date	Format	Distributor
South Korea	December 4, 2015	CD, digital download	SM, KT Music
Worldwide	December 4, 2015	Digital download	SM
