= Holler (EP) =

EP by Girls' Generation-TTS
- Released: September 16, 2014
- Recorded: 2014; SM Studios, (Seoul, South Korea)
- Genres: Pop; R&B
- Language: Korean
- Labels: SM; KT

Girls' Generation-TTS chronology
Twinkle (2012)	Holler (2014)	Dear Santa (2015)

Girls' Generation chronology
Mr.Mr. (2014)	Holler (2014)	Lion Heart (2015)

Singles from Holler
- 1. "Whisper" Released: September 13, 2014; 2. "Holler" Released: September 16, 2014

Holler is the second extended play by the South Korean girl group, Girls' Generation-TTS. It was released digitally on September 16, 2014, and physically on September 18, 2014, by SM Entertainment.

== Background and release ==
Holler debuted at number 1 on both Gaon's weekly chart and Billboard World Albums chart. As a result, TTS became the third Korean artist and the first female one to have at least two albums at number 1 on the latter chart. The group previously achieved the number 1 spot two years back, with their debut release, Twinkle. They made their first comeback performance in a showcase at the Olympic Park's Woori Financial Art Hall in Seoul, performing various songs, including tracks from their previous album.

During an interview with Billboard, the three singers expressed, "This album was really personal for us and it was fun...to put out a much more raw side of our music...the music we put together has so much more layers, so much more depth to it in terms of sound, choruses or harmonizing together....Our main goal was to not be visually entertaining, but be vocally entertaining." They further described the album as an edgier, more mature version of its predecessor, Twinkle, and stated, "We want to make feel good songs that are relatable, we want to make albums that are more natural...and speak from the bottom of our hearts." The trio revealed that Taeyeon took responsibility for the song selection, Seohyun penned the lyrics to the song, "Only U", while Tiffany served as the visual director to the overall album image and the concept of "Holler" music video. The release of the album coincided with the broadcast of TTS's reality television show, The TaeTiSeo; thus, some footage of the album preparation was shown.

The group performed various songs for their promotional activities, including "Holler", "Whisper", "Only U", and "Adrenaline". They achieved two "Number 1" wins on Mnet's M Countdown, one win on MBC's Music Core, one win on SBS's Inkigayo, and one win on KBS's Music Bank. The group made some radio and television appearances such as on MBC's "Sunny's FM Date", or KBS2's You Hee-yeol's Sketchbook, where they sang a rendition of Destiny's Child's "Cater 2 U".

== Singles ==
Professional ratings
Review scores
Source	Rating
Today	3/5 stars

The single track "Whisper" was released on September 13, peaking at number 4 on Gaon's weekly chart.

The title track, "Holler" peaked at number 3 on Gaon's weekly chart and number 6 on Billboard's World digital song chart. Tiffany described it as "a rhythmical song that has a big brass sound that stands out with a funky groove, soul, and is overflowing with energy". Its music video became number 1 on YouTube's weekly "Top 20 K-Pop Music Video Chart", and later the most viewed K-Pop video in America & around the world for September 2014. The song was initially given to Japanese singer Mizuki Watanabe under the title "Hello Me!", which was a B-side of her 2007 single, "Best Friend".

== Track listing ==
Credits adapted from Holler liner notes.

Holler
No.	Title	Lyrics	Music	Arrangement	Length
1.	"Holler"	Mafly (Joombas)	Fredrik "Figge" Boström; Anna Engh	Fredrik "Figge" Boström; Maria Marcus	03:03
2.	"Adrenaline" (Korean: 아드레날린; RR: Adeurenallin)	Kim MinJeong; Mafly (Joombas)	Ina Wroldsen; Lucas Secon; Mich Hansen; Jonas Jeberg	Ina Wroldsen; Lucas Secon; Mich Hansen; Jonas Jeberg; Yoo Han-jin	03:29
3.	"Whisper" (Korean: 내가 네게; RR: Naega Nege; lit. 'I Tell You')	Mafly (Joombas)	Im Kwang-wook (Devine Channel); Martin Hoberg Hedegaard; Andrew Jackson	Im Kwang-wook (Devine Channel); Im "Chase" Chae-seop (Devine Channel)	03:38
4.	"Stay"	Brian Kim	Daniel Caesar (Caesar & Loui); Ludwig Lindell (Caesar & Loui); Ollipop (The Kennel); Hayley Aitken (The Kennel)	The Kennel	03:31
5.	"Only U"	Seohyun	Lauren Dyson; Sebastian Thott; Erik Lidbom	Sebastian Thott	03:37
6.	"Eyes"	Mafly (Joombas)	Albi Albertsson (Mussashi); Mara Kim	Mussashi	02:39
Total length:					19:57

== Charts ==
=== Weekly charts ===
Chart (2014)	Peak position
South Korea (Gaon)	1
Japan (Oricon)	23
Taiwan (G-Music)	1
US Billboard World Albums	1
US Billboard Heatseekers Albums	11

=== Year-end charts ===
Chart (2014)	Position
South Korea (Gaon)	22

=== Sales ===
Country	Sales
South Korea	87,513

== Awards and nominations ==
=== Music programs awards ===
Song	Program	Date
"Holler"	Mnet's M Countdown	September 25, 2014
"Holler"	Mnet's M Countdown	October 2, 2014
"Holler"	SBS's Inkigayo	September 28, 2014
"Holler"	KBS2's Music Bank	October 3, 2014

== Release history ==
Country	Date	Distributing label	Format
South Korea	September 16, 2014	SM, KT Music	Digital download
South Korea	September 18, 2014	SM, KT Music	CD
Hong Kong	September 18, 2014	SM, Universal	CD
Worldwide	September 16, 2014	SM, Universal	Digital Download
