= Seohyun =

South Korean singer and actress (born 1991)

- Seohyun in 2026
- Born: Seo Ju-hyun; June 28, 1991 (age 35); Seoul, South Korea
- Education: Dongguk University
- Occupations: Singer; actress; songwriter
- Agent: Dream ENT
- Musical career
- Genres: K-pop; R&B
- Years active: 2007–present
- Label: SM
- Member of: Girls' Generation; Girls' Generation-TTS; SM Town
- Website: Official website

Korean name
- Hangul: 서주현
- RR: Seo Juhyeon
- MR: Sŏ Chuhyŏn

Stage name
- Hangul: 서현
- RR: Seohyeon
- MR: Sŏhyŏn

Seo Ju-hyun (Korean: 서주현; born June 28, 1991), known professionally as Seohyun, is a South Korean singer, actress, and songwriter. She debuted as a member of girl group Girls' Generation (and later its subgroup Girls' Generation-TTS) in August 2007, which went on to become one of the best-selling artists in South Korea and one of South Korea's most widely known girl groups worldwide. Seohyun released her first extended play Don't Say No in 2017. She left SM Entertainment later that year, although she remains as a member of Girls' Generation.

Aside from her music career, she has established herself as an actress. Following her supporting role in the television drama Passionate Love (2013) and Moon Lovers: Scarlet Heart Ryeo (2016), she starred in Bad Thief, Good Thief (2017), Time (2018), Private Lives (2020), Jinxed at First (2022), Song of the Bandits (2023) and The First Night with the Duke (2025). Her film work includes Love and Leashes (2022) and Holy Night: Demon Hunters (2025). She also participated in the original and Korean versions of stage musicals including Moon Embracing the Sun, Gone with the Wind and Mamma Mia.

== Early life and education ==
Seohyun was born Seo Ju-hyun on June 28, 1991, in Doksan-dong, Geumcheon District, Seoul, South Korea, and is the only child in her family. Her mother was a chairwoman at a piano school, and Seohyun was taught how to play piano as well as violin and traditional Korean drums in her early childhood. She also learned horseback riding and skating as a child. Her parents did not encourage her to become a celebrity, but Seohyun credited them as the ones who helped her choose her career path by letting her experience different things. As a fifth grader, Seohyun was discovered by a talent scout while riding in a subway train. She sang children's songs for her audition at SM Entertainment and was accepted as a trainee. Seohyun cited BoA, S.E.S and Fin.K.L. as her main influences to become a singer, expressing "I thought it was cool to show and communicate the emotions through songs".

Seohyun graduated from Jeonju Arts High School in February 2010.

She attended Dongguk University, majoring in theatre acting, and graduated in August 2014, receiving an achievement award at the graduation ceremony. Her fellow Girls' Generation member, Yoona, attended the same university.

== Career ==
=== 2007–2011: Career beginnings ===
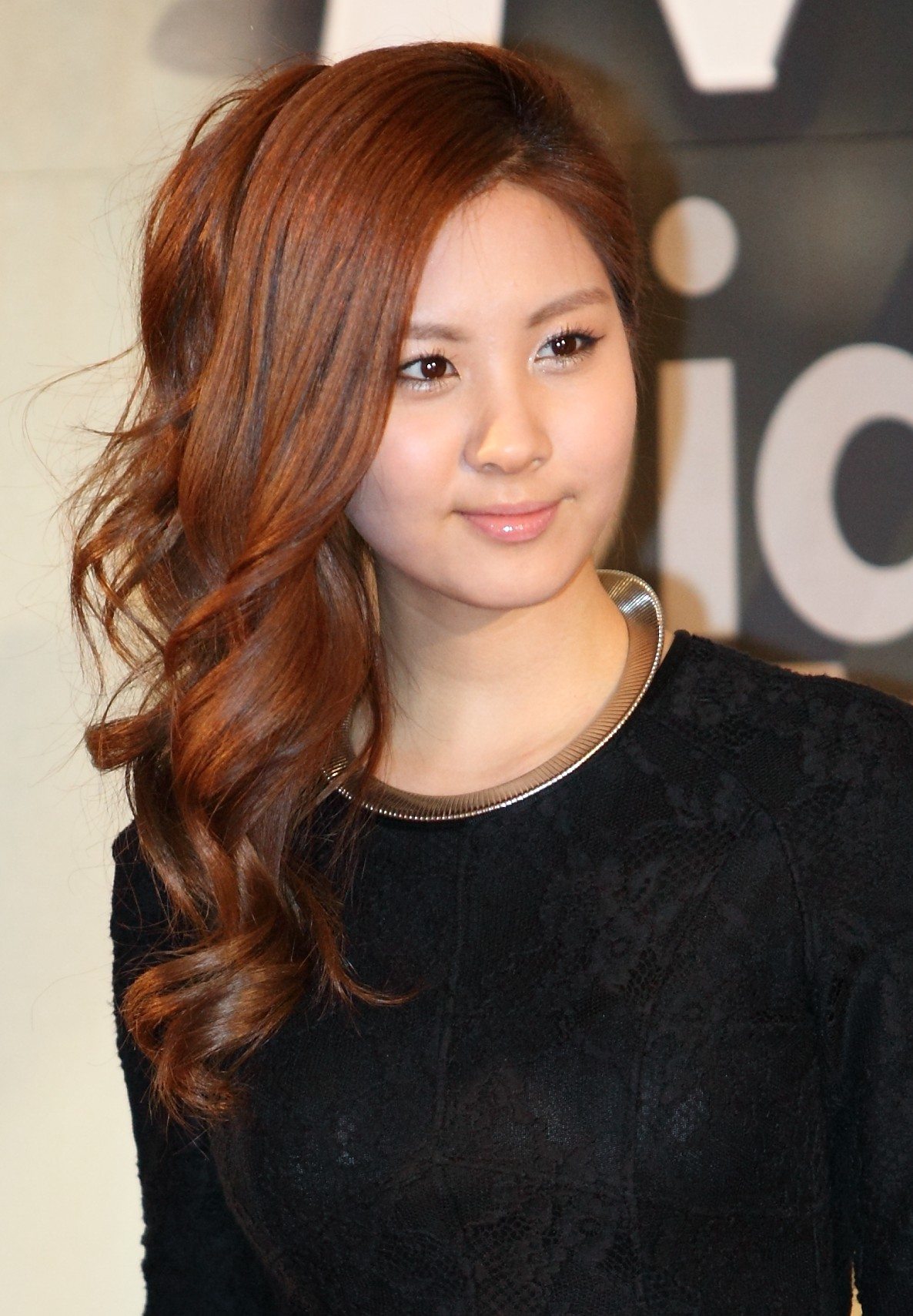
Seohyun at the 2010 Melon Music Awards

In August 2007, Seohyun made her official debut as the youngest member of girl group Girls' Generation. The group gained significant popularity after the release of their hit single "Gee" in 2009.

Seohyun's early solo work mostly involved songs recorded for side projects and original soundtracks. Although they did not achieve much commercial success; her duet titled "JjaLaJaJJa" with veteran singer Joo Hyun-mi earned a "Trot Music of the Year" nomination at the 2009 Mnet Asian Music Awards. In 2010–2011, Seohyun appeared in MBC's variety show We Got Married 2, alongside CNBLUE's Yonghwa. They played a make-believe couple, portraying what life would be like if they were married. In addition, Seohyun was cast as voice actor for the Korean-dubbed version of animated film Despicable Me (2010) and its sequel Despicable Me 2 (2013), together with fellow member Taeyeon. She voiced the character of Edith, who is known for her rebellious attitude.

=== 2012–2016: TTS and musical acting ===
In April 2012, Seohyun, along with fellow members Taeyeon and Tiffany, formed a Girls' Generation subgroup named TTS. Their debut EP, Twinkle, met with much success and became the eighth highest selling album of the year in South Korea. The subgroup went on to release two more EPs: Holler (2014) and Dear Santa (2015). Besides contributing her vocals to Girls' Generation and TTS songs, Seohyun began to become more active in lyrics writing. She co-wrote the songs "Baby Maybe" and "XYZ" (I Got a Boy, 2013) and was credited as the sole lyricist for "Only U" (Holler, 2014) and "Dear Santa" (Dear Santa, 2015).

In 2013, Seohyun debuted as an actress when she was cast for a supporting role in SBS's drama Passionate Love. She played Han Yu-rim, a veterinary student and first love of the male lead character. Director Bae Tae-sub said Seohyun's persona "perfectly paralleled that of her role" and "her understanding and expressiveness of the character exceeds those of a rookie actress".

Seohyun, self-described as someone who likes both singing and acting, began to develop an interest in musical theatre. She named musical actress Ock Joo-hyun, who later became her mentor, as her main influence. Although she had wanted to be in a musical for a long time, she rejected casting offers because she felt unprepared. In January 2014, her wish was fulfilled as she accepted her first musical acting role. Seohyun made her theatrical debut in the musical, Moon Embracing the Sun, which was adapted from the novel of the same name. Seohyun played the lead role, Yeon-woo, the daughter of a noble family who has a love relationship with both the King and his brother.

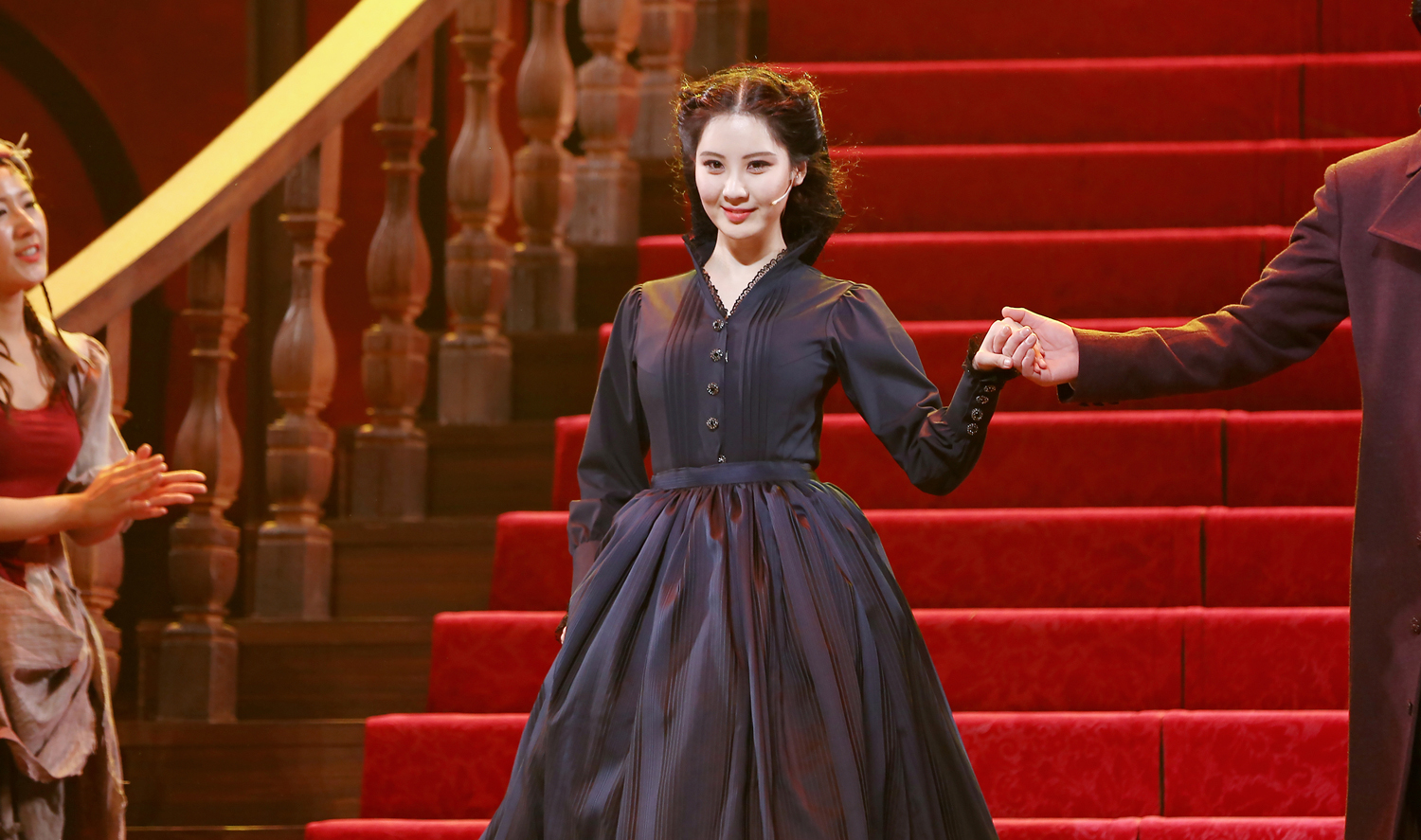
Seohyun performing in the Gone with the Wind musical in 2015

In January 2015, Seohyun was cast in the role of Scarlett O'Hara in the Korean version of Autant en emporte le vent, a French musical based on Gone with the Wind. She received encouraging review for her performance. Seon Mi-gyeong of OSEN said that while Seohyun's performance cannot surpass that of Bada, who shared the same role, her "fierce voice" complemented and successfully expressed an arrogant Scarlett O'Hara. Kim Hyun-joong of Sports Chosun noted Seohyun's occasional "clumsy" acting, but compared her to Ock Joo-hyun during her rookie days and said that "her ability to bring emotion through song, the most important part of a musical, rivaled that of a veteran actor. Despite a short career, she endlessly showed us various colours and peculiar charms of a woman's life."

From February–June 2016, Seohyun was cast in the Korean version of the musical Mamma Mia. She played a character named Sophie, a 20-year-old bride-to-be, who hopes to find out who her biological father is on her wedding day. Kim Geum-yeong from CNB Journal commented on Seohyun's improvement from her prior musical performances, praising her "natural acting" and "daring side" while Park Jeong-hwan from News1 claimed Seohyun's performance made the musical "all the more entertaining". Seohyun next played supporting roles in Chinese romantic film So I Married An Anti-fan and SBS's historical drama Moon Lovers: Scarlet Heart Ryeo; the latter earned her a Special Acting Award at the 2016 SBS Drama Awards.

=== 2017–2018: Solo debut and departure from SM Entertainment ===
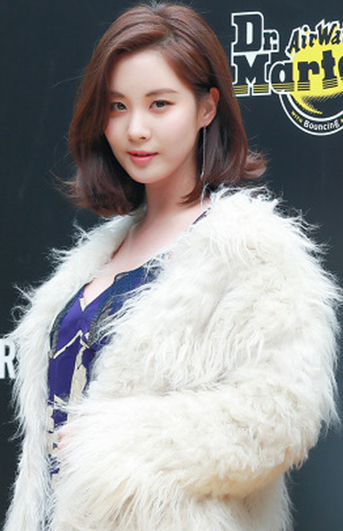
Seohyun at a fashion event in January 2018

In January 2017, Seohyun became the third Girls' Generation member to release a solo album, with the release of her debut extended play titled Don't Say No. For this record, Seohyun took full initiatives and control of the production process, shaping her own musical style–a fulfillment of what she was unable to do fully being in a larger musical group. Tamar Herman from Billboard noted the album presented a "new maturity" to the singer. Don't Say No debuted atop the South Korean Gaon Album Chart. To accompany her solo release, she held a concert residency titled "Love, Still – Seohyun", part of a series of concerts by SM Entertainment artists.

After taking part in OnStyle's web-drama Ruby Ruby Love, Seohyun next starred in MBC's weekend drama Bad Thief, Good Thief as Kang So-joo, a police-woman-turned-investigator who struggles to fight against the abusive officials. Her portrayal of the character earned her the Best New Actress award at the 2017 MBC Drama Awards.

In October 2017, Seohyun left SM Entertainment after her contract ended. Her future activities with Girls' Generation remain in discussion.

In 2018, Seohyun was cast as the female lead in MBC's melodrama The Time as the character Seol Ji-hyun, a bright and optimistic woman who became depressed after the tragic death of her sibling.

In September 2018, Seohyun announced her first fanmeeting tour, Memories, in Seoul, Bangkok, Taipei, Osaka and Hong Kong.

=== 2019–2024: New agency and continued acting career ===
In March 2019, Seohyun signed with Namoo Actors. A year after signing with her new agency, she starred in the short drama Hello Dracula. She played the role of An-na, an elementary school teacher who hid her emotions from her mother since the day she came out to her as a lesbian. Later that year, she starred in the JTBC television series Private Lives as Cha Joo-eun, a swindler who has to choose a deceptive path to survive in Korea.

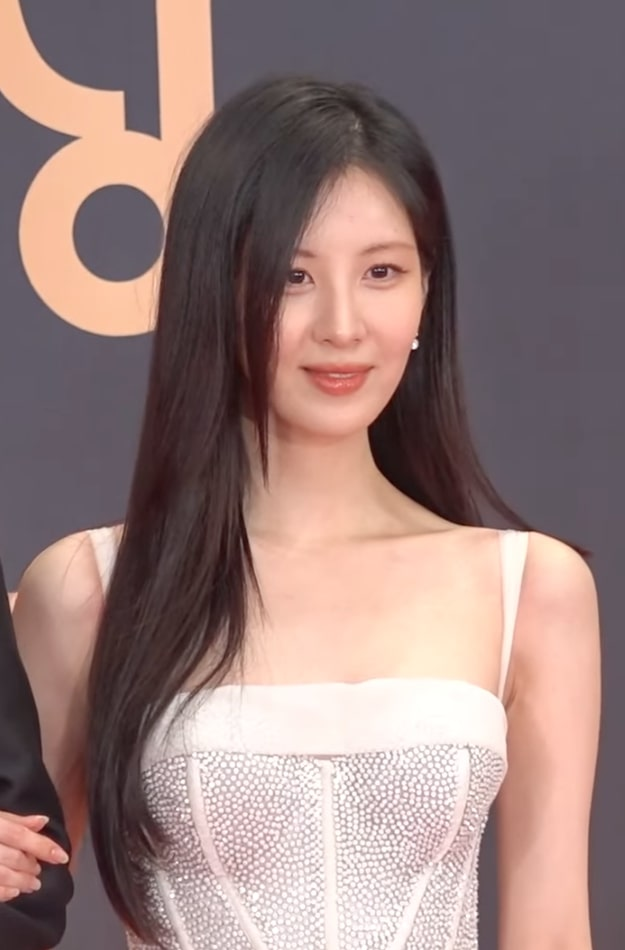
Seohyun at the KBS Drama Awards in 2022

In February 2022, Seohyun made her debut in a movie as a lead actress in the Netflix original movie Love and Leashes, based on the webtoon Moral Sense. She played the character of Jung Jiwoo, a competent public relations team member who accidentally found out her co-worker's BDSM desires. Her portrayal of the role earned her a nomination for the Best New Actress award under the Film category at the 58th Baeksang Arts Awards. In April 2022, Seohyun renewed her contract with Namoo Actors.

In June 2022, Seohyun starred in the KBS fantasy romance series Jinxed at First, She played the character Lee Seul-bi, who has the special ability of seeing the future of any person she touches. The role earned her the Best New Actress award at the 2022 KBS Drama Awards, as well as the Best Couple Award with the male lead co-actor Na In-woo.

In September 2023, she starred in the Netflix original series, Song of the Bandits. She played the character Nam Hee Shin, an independence activist disguised as the head of the Railway Bureau of the Japanese Government-General of Korea who has hidden her true identity.

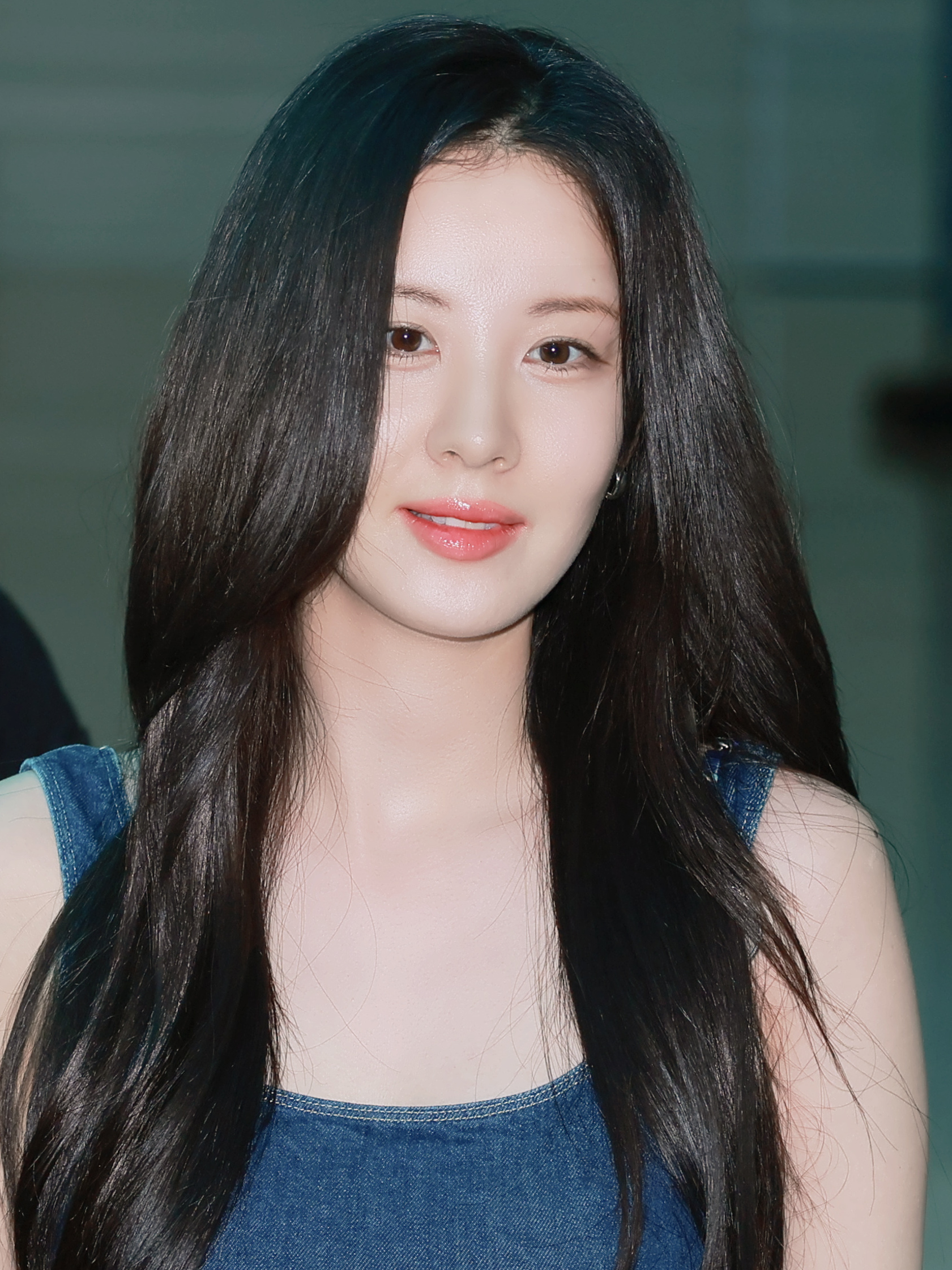
Seohyun in 2024

=== 2025–present: Departure from Namoo Actors and new agency ===
On April 24, 2025, Seohyun ended her contract with Namoo Actors. Seohyun starred in action-horror film Holy Night: Demon Hunters as Sharon, an exorcist and a member of the trio of demon hunters called 'Holy Night'. It was released on April 30, 2025 in 933 screens. It opened at first place on Korean box office with 121,321 admissions and a gross of US$680,433. As of June 16, 2025, the film has grossed US$6,497,280 worldwide. On May 15, 2025, Seohyun signed an exclusive contract with Lead Entertainment.

After three years, Seohyun return to the small screen via romantic-comedy series, The First Night with the Duke. The series premiered on KBS2 on June 11, 2025. She played the role of K, a contemporary college student who awakens unexpectedly inside her beloved historical romance book. She possessed the body of a supporting character in the novel named Cha Seon-chaek and unexpectedly changed the plot of the novel.

Seohyun has been announced to star in the upcoming film Seeking the King. In December 2025, Seohyun signed with new agency Dream ENT. In March 2026, Seohyun will make her debut as a violinist at the 8th Regular Concert of the Sol Philharmonic Orchestra, to be held on March 13. She will play "Csárdás", the famous piece by Vittorio Monti.

== Other ventures ==
=== Philanthropy ===
In 2011, Seohyun named former United Nations Secretary-General Ban Ki-moon as her life mentor and role model, stating that his book, at one point in time, had helped her endure hard times. She was appointed as the United Nations Pavilion's ambassador at Yeosu Expo, where she was presented with the honor by Ban. In 2013, as an effort to help less-fortunate students with their studies, she donated 100 million Korean won to Dongguk University.

In 2020, Seohyun donated feminine hygiene products worth 100 million South Korean won to the NGO Official Development Association Korea. In April 2022, she made another donation consisting of 17,000 sanitary pads. The products were distributed to 31 organizations, including four branches of the Nanum Employment Welfare Foundation, the Healthy Families Multicultural Family Support Center in Uijeongbu, member organizations of the Uijeongbu Regional Children's Center Association, and 500 students from multicultural and low-income families.

=== Endorsements ===
From 2011 to 2013, Seohyun was the official international ambassador for cosmetics brand The Face Shop. From 2016 to 2018, Seohyun was selected as South Korean ambassador for hair care brand Pantene along with fellow member Yuri. In 2021, Seohyun was selected as the Asia-Pacific ambassador for mid-range beauty brand Clinique. In May 2022, Seohyun was selected as brand muse for South Korean jewelry brand TirrLirr. In the same year, Seohyun was selected as the muse for ACWELL, a Korean natural dermatology cosmetic brand. In January 2024, fashion and lifestyle brand Metrocity had selected Seohyun as its muse and ambassador for 2024.

== Discography ==
=== Extended plays ===
- Don't Say No (2017)

== Theater ==
Year	Title	Role	Ref.
2014	Moon Embracing the Sun	Heo Yeon-woo	
2015	Gone with the Wind	Scarlett O'Hara	
2016	Mamma Mia!	Sophie Sheridan	

== Accolades ==
=== Awards and nominations ===
Name of the award ceremony, year presented, category, nominee of the award, and the result of the nomination
Award ceremony	Year	Category	Nominee / Work	Result	Ref.
Baeksang Arts Awards	2022	Best New Actress – Film	Love and Leashes	Nominated	
KBS Drama Awards	2022	Popularity Award, Actress	Jinxed at First	Nominated	
KBS Drama Awards	2022	Best New Actress	Jinxed at First	Won	
KBS Drama Awards	2022	Best Couple	Herself (with Na In-woo); Jinxed at First	Won	
KBS Drama Awards	2025	Top Excellence Award, Actress	The First Night with the Duke	Nominated	
KBS Drama Awards	2025	Popularity Award, Actress	The First Night with the Duke	Nominated	
KBS Drama Awards	2025	Excellence Award, Actress in a Miniseries	The First Night with the Duke	Won	
KBS Drama Awards	2025	Best Couple	Herself (with Ok Taec-yeon); The First Night with the Duke	Won	
Korea Best Star Awards	2018	Best Drama Star	Time	Won	
Korea Drama Awards	2017	Best New Actress	Bad Thief, Good Thief	Nominated	
MBC Drama Awards	2017	Best New Actress	Bad Thief, Good Thief	Won	
MBC Drama Awards	2017	Top Excellence Award, Actress in Weekend Drama	Bad Thief, Good Thief	Nominated	
MBC Drama Awards	2018	Top Excellence Award, Actress in a Wednesday-Thursday Miniseries	Time	Nominated	
MBC Drama Awards	2018	Fighting Performance Award	Time	Won	
MBC Entertainment Awards	2010	Most Popular Couple	Seohyun (with Jung Yong-hwa); We Got Married	Won	
Mnet Asian Music Awards	2009	Trot Music of the Year	"JjaRaJaJja" (with Joo Hyun-mi)	Nominated	
Mnet 20's Choice Awards	2011	Hot Campus Goddess	Seohyun	Nominated	
Mnet Media Awards	2011	Most Cute and Gorgeous Lady	Seohyun	Nominated	
SBS Drama Awards	2016	Special Acting Award, Actress in a Fantasy Drama	Moon Lovers: Scarlet Heart Ryeo	Won	
Seoul International Drama Awards	2013	Best Song from a Drama	"I'll Wait for You"	Nominated	
The Seoul Awards	2018	Popularity Award, Actress	Time	Won	

=== State honors ===
Name of country, year given, and name of honor
Country Or Organization	Year	Honor Or Award	Ref.
Dongguk University	2014	The Lifetime Achievement Award	
Ministry of Culture, Sports and Tourism	2010	Recognition Award	
