= List of Taeyeon concert tours =

Taeyeon concert tours
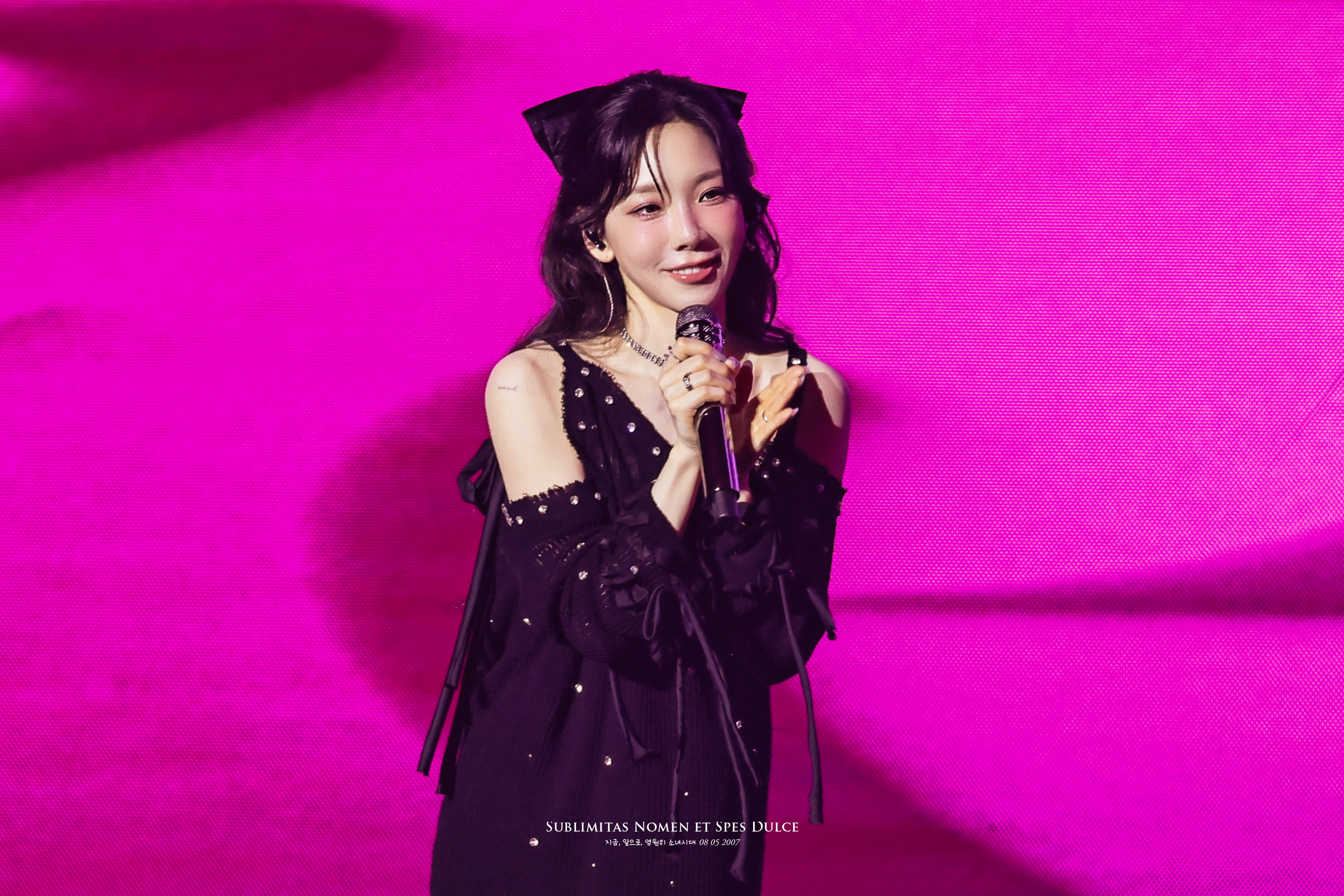
- Taeyeon performing in 2025
- Concert tours: 6
- Concerts: 3

South Korean singer Taeyeon has embarked on numerous headlining concert tours, four of which toured multiple countries in Asia. The concert, Butterfly Kiss, made her the first Korean female artist to embark on a full-scale concert while still being a member of an active girl group. She was the first South Korean female solo artist to hold a solo concert at Hong Kong's AsiaWorld Expo Arena. She also became the first South Korean female soloist to stage back-to-back shows in Thailand.

In 2023, Taeyeon's first arena tour The Odd of Love was announced, starting with a two-day concert at the KSPO Dome in June 2023. It was making Taeyeon the first South Korean female artist to headline a concert at the venue both as a solo artist and as a member of a group. With her shows in Thailand, Taeyeon became the first South Korean female solo artist to headline a two-day solo concert at the Impact Arena, the largest indoor-arena in the country. She also became the first South Korean female solo artist to headline concerts in Taiwan's Taipei Arena, Singapore Indoor Stadium and the second South Korean female solo artist to hold a concert at an arena in Japan, following her label mate BoA.

== 1st Asia Tour: Taeyeon Solo Concert "Persona" ==
1st Asia Tour: Taeyeon Solo Concert "Persona"
- Tour by Taeyeon
- Associated album: My Voice
- Start date: May 12, 2017
- End date: June 11, 2017
- Legs: 1
- No. of shows: 9

Taeyeon concert chronology
- 1st Asia Tour: Taeyeon Solo Concert "Persona" (2017); 2nd Asia Tour: 's... Taeyeon Concert (2018–2019)

Persona was Taeyeon's first Asia concert tour. The first show was held on May 12, 2017, at Olympic Hall in Seoul, South Korea.

Setlist

Seoul, South Korea
1. U R
2. 날개 (Feel So Fine)
3. I
4. Make Me Love You
5. Fire
6. I Got Love
7. I'm OK
8. Eraser
9. Sweet Love
10. 쌍둥이자리 (Gemini) + Lonely Night
11. 희재 (HeeJae)
12. 수채화 (Love in Color)
13. Rain
14. I Blame On You
15. Cover Up
16. Hands On Me
17. 스트레스 (Stress)
18. When I Was Young
19. 비밀 (Secret)
20. 11:11
21. Why

Encore

1. Fine
2. Time Lapse
3. Curtain Call

Concert dates
Date	City	Country	Venue	Attendance
May 12, 2017	Seoul	South Korea	Olympic Hall	9,000
May 13, 2017	Seoul	South Korea	Olympic Hall	9,000
May 14, 2017	Seoul	South Korea	Olympic Hall	9,000
May 19, 2017	New Taipei City	Taiwan	Xinzhuang Gymnasium	15,000
May 20, 2017	New Taipei City	Taiwan	Xinzhuang Gymnasium	15,000
May 21, 2017	New Taipei City	Taiwan	Xinzhuang Gymnasium	15,000
May 28, 2017	Bangkok	Thailand	Thunder Dome	5,000
June 10, 2017	Hong Kong	China	AsiaWorld–Expo Hall 10	10,000
June 11, 2017	Hong Kong	China	AsiaWorld–Expo Hall 10	10,000
Total				39,000

== 2nd Asia Tour: 's... Taeyeon Concert ==
2nd Asia Tour: 's... Taeyeon Concert
- Tour by Taeyeon
- Associated album: Something New
- Start date: October 20, 2018
- End date: March 24, 2019
- No. of shows: 9

Taeyeon concert chronology
- 1st Asia Tour: Taeyeon Solo Concert "Persona" (2017); 2nd Asia Tour: 's... Taeyeon Concert (2018–2019); Taeyeon Japan Tour 2019 ~Signal~ (2019)

's... Taeyeon Concert was Taeyeon's second Asia concert tour organised by SM Entertainment and Dream Maker Entertainment Limited.

Set list

's... Taeyeon Concert
1. Here I Am
2. I Got Love
3. Fire
4. Love You Like Crazy
5. Something New
6. Do You Love Me?
7. Rain
8. 저녁의 이유 (All Night Long)
9. 바람 바람 바람 (Baram X 3)
10. Stay
11. Holiday
12. Cover Up
13. All Night
14. Fashion
15. Why
16. 너의 생일 (One Day)
17. 쌍둥이자리 (Gemini)
18. 비밀 (Secret)
19. Gravity
20. Fine
21. 날개 (Feel So Fine)

Encore

1. Time Lapse
2. Circus
3. I

Double Encore (21 days only)

1. 11:11
's… one Encore Concert in Seoul
1. Here I Am
2. I Got Love
3. Fire
4. Love You Like Crazy
5. Something New
6. 11:11
7. Blue
8. Rain
9. 사계 (Four Seasons)
10. 저녁의 이유 (All Night Long)
11. 바람 바람 바람 (Baram X 3)
12. 스트레스 (Stress)
13. Cover Up
14. Why
15. 너의 생일 (One Day)
16. 비밀 (Secret)
17. Circus
18. Gravity
19. Fine
20. 날개 (Feel So Fine)

Encore

1. Time Lapse
2. I
3. Curtain Call

Double Encore

1. Hands On Me^{Day 1 (23rd)} / U R^{Day 2 (24th)}

Concert dates
Date	City	Country	Venue	Attendance
October 20, 2018	Seoul	South Korea	Jamsil Arena	10,000
October 21, 2018	Seoul	South Korea	Jamsil Arena	10,000
November 17, 2018	Hong Kong	China	AsiaWorld–Arena	—
December 1, 2018	Bangkok	Thailand	Thunder Dome	9,500
December 2, 2018	Bangkok	Thailand	Thunder Dome	9,500
December 14, 2018	Manila	Philippines	New Frontier Theater	—
January 12, 2019	Singapore		Singapore Expo Hall 1	—
's...one (Encore)
March 23, 2019	Seoul	South Korea	Jamsil Arena	11,000
March 24, 2019	Seoul	South Korea	Jamsil Arena	11,000

== Taeyeon Japan Tour 2019 ~Signal~ ==
Taeyeon Japan Tour 2019 ~Signal~
- Tour by Taeyeon
- Associated album: Voice
- Start date: April 13, 2019
- End date: May 10, 2019
- Legs: 1
- No. of shows: 6

Taeyeon concert chronology
- 2nd Asia Tour: 's... Taeyeon Concert (2018–2019); Taeyeon Japan Tour 2019 ~Signal~ (2019); 3rd Asia Tour: Taeyeon Concert – The Unseen (2020)

Taeyeon Japan Tour 2019 ~Signal~ was Taeyeon's first Japanese concert tour. The first show was held on April 13, 2019, at Fukuoka Sunpalace.

Set list

Main setlist
1. Make Me Love You (KR)
2. Stay (JP)
3. HORIZON (JP)
4. 바람 바람 바람 (Baram X 3) (KR)
5. I'm OK (KR)
6. I Got Love (KR)
7. TURNT AND BURNT (JP)
8. VOICE (JP)
9. Rescue Me (JP)
10. Sweet Love (KR)
11. I'm The Greatest (JP)
12. Something New (KR)
13. Vanilla (JP)
14. I Found You (JP)
15. 사계 (Four Seasons) (KR)
16. Rain (KR)
17. 너의 생일 (One Day) (KR)
18. 11:11 (KR)
19. SIGNAL (JP)

Encore

1. Curtain Call (KR)
2. I (JP)

Concert dates
Date	City	Country	Venue
April 13, 2019	Fukuoka	Japan	Fukuoka Sunpalace
April 22, 2019	Osaka	Japan	Osaka International Convention Center
April 23, 2019	Osaka	Japan	Osaka International Convention Center
April 27, 2019	Nagoya	Japan	NTK Hall
May 9, 2019	Tokyo	Japan	NHK Hall
May 10, 2019	Tokyo	Japan	NHK Hall
May 31, 2019	Tokyo	Japan	Tokyo International Forum Hall A

== 3rd Asia Tour: Taeyeon Concert – The Unseen ==
3rd Asia Tour: Taeyeon Concert – The Unseen
- Tour by Taeyeon
- Associated album: Purpose
- Start date: January 17, 2020
- End date: January 19, 2020
- No. of shows: 3

Taeyeon concert chronology
- Taeyeon Japan Tour 2019 ~Signal~ (2019); 3rd Asia Tour: Taeyeon Concert – The Unseen (2020); Taeyeon Japan Tour 2020

Taeyeon Concert – The Unseen was Taeyeon's third Asia tour (fourth overall) held by Taeyeon. The first show was held on January 17, 2020, at Olympic Handball Gymnasium in Seoul, South Korea.

Set list

Seoul, South Korea
1. Find Me
2. 날개 (Feel So Fine)
3. Circus
4. Something New
5. Night
6. City Love
7. I Do
8. 사계 (Four Seasons)
9. 하하하 (LOL)
10. I Got Love
11. Love You Like Crazy
12. Better Babe
13. 불티 (Spark)
14. Here I Am
15. 숨겨진 세상 (Into the Unknown)
16. Wine
17. Time Lapse
18. I
19. Gravity

Encore

1. Why
2. 바람 바람 바람 (Baram X 3) (VCR)
3. 스트레스 (Stress)
4. Hands on Me
5. 내게 들려주고 싶은 말 (Dear Me)

Double Encore (19일 한정)

1. 11:11

Concert dates
Date	City	Country	Venue	Attendance
January 17, 2020	Seoul	South Korea	SK Olympic Handball Gymnasium	15,000
January 18, 2020	Seoul	South Korea	SK Olympic Handball Gymnasium	15,000
January 19, 2020	Seoul	South Korea	SK Olympic Handball Gymnasium	15,000

Cancelled dates

Date	City	Country	Venue	Reason
February 1, 2020	Singapore		Singapore Indoor Stadium	Cancelled due to COVID-19
February 22, 2020	Bangkok	Thailand	Thunder Dome	Cancelled due to COVID-19
February 23, 2020	Bangkok	Thailand	Thunder Dome	Cancelled due to COVID-19
March 6, 2020	New Taipei City	Taiwan	Xinzhuang Gymnasium	Cancelled due to COVID-19
March 7, 2020	New Taipei City	Taiwan	Xinzhuang Gymnasium	Cancelled due to COVID-19
March 8, 2020	New Taipei City	Taiwan	Xinzhuang Gymnasium	Cancelled due to COVID-19

== Taeyeon Japan Tour 2020 ==
Cancelled dates

Date	City	Country	Venue	Reason
April 24, 2020	Fukuoka	Japan	Fukuoka Sunpalace	Cancelled due to COVID-19
April 25, 2020	Fukuoka	Japan	Fukuoka Sunpalace	Cancelled due to COVID-19
May 2, 2020	Hiroshima	Japan	Hiroshima Bunka Gakuen HBG Hall	Cancelled due to COVID-19
May 4, 2020	Osaka	Japan	Grand Cube Osaka	Cancelled due to COVID-19
May 6, 2020	Yokohama	Japan	Pacifico Yokohama	Cancelled due to COVID-19
May 16, 2020	Nagoya	Japan	Nagoya Congress Center	Cancelled due to COVID-19
May 17, 2020	Nagoya	Japan	Nagoya Congress Center	Cancelled due to COVID-19
May 24, 2020	Yokohama	Japan	Pacifico Yokohama	Cancelled due to COVID-19
June 5, 2020	Hyōgo	Japan	Kobe Kokusai Hall	Cancelled due to COVID-19
June 7, 2020	Saitama	Japan	Omiya Sonic City Large Hall	Cancelled due to COVID-19
June 14, 2020	Hokkaidō	Japan	Sapporo Cultural Arts Theater	Cancelled due to COVID-19

== Concerts ==
=== The Agit – Taeyeon's Very Special Day ===
Taeyeon's Very Special Day
- Tour by Taeyeon
- Location: South Korea
- Associated album: I
- Start date: October 23, 2015
- End date: November 1, 2015
- No. of shows: 7

Taeyeon's Very Special Day (Korean: 태연의 아주 특별한 하루; RR: Taeyeonui aju teukbyeolhan haru) is the first concert series by Taeyeon, which was held from October 23 to 25, 2015, and later from October 29 to November 1, 2015.

Set list
1. "I"
2. "Farewell"
3. "Set Me Free"
4. "Only One"
5. "Missing You Like Crazy"
6. "Can You Hear Me"
7. "Holler" (Girls' Generation-TTS cover)
8. "Eyes" (Girls' Generation-TTS cover)
9. "Twinkle" (Girls' Generation-TTS cover)
10. "Stress"
11. "End of a Day"
12. "I Love You" / "Love Me like You Do" (Ellie Goulding cover) / "Chandelier" (Sia cover) / "I'm in Love" (Narsha cover)
13. "Merry-Go-Round" / "Lion Heart" (Girls' Generation cover)
14. "Lion Heart" / "Top Secret (Shake the Tree)" (Girls' Generation cover)
15. "Dancing Queen" / "Goodbye" (Girls' Generation cover)

Encore

16. "U R"
17. "Gemini"

Concert dates
Date	City	Country	Venue	Attendance
October 23, 2015	Seoul	South Korea	SMTOWN COEX Artium Theatre	5,600
October 24, 2015	Seoul	South Korea	SMTOWN COEX Artium Theatre	5,600
October 25, 2015	Seoul	South Korea	SMTOWN COEX Artium Theatre	5,600
October 29, 2015	Seoul	South Korea	SMTOWN COEX Artium Theatre	5,600
October 30, 2015	Seoul	South Korea	SMTOWN COEX Artium Theatre	5,600
October 31, 2015	Seoul	South Korea	SMTOWN COEX Artium Theatre	5,600
November 1, 2015	Seoul	South Korea	SMTOWN COEX Artium Theatre	5,600

=== Taeyeon, Butterfly Kiss ===
Taeyeon, Butterfly Kiss
- Tour by Taeyeon
- Location: South Korea
- Associated album: Why
- Start date: July 9, 2016
- End date: August 7, 2016
- No. of shows: 4

Taeyeon, Butterfly Kiss is the first headlining concert by Taeyeon, which was held at Olympic Hall from July 9 to 10, 2016, and later at KBS Busan Hall from August 6 to 7, 2016.

Set list
1. "Up & Down"
2. "Good Thing"
3. "Fashion"
4. "Night"
5. "Rain"
6. "Gemini"
7. "Farewell"
8. "If"
9. "Can You Hear Me"
10. "I Love You"
11. "Time Spent Walking Through Memories" (Nell cover)
12. "The Blue Night of Jeju Island"
13. "Atlantis Princess" (BoA cover)
14. "Why"
15. "Hands on Me"
16. "Starlight"
17. "Secret"
18. "Pray"
19. "I"

Encore

20. "Stress"
21. "Twinkle"(Girls' Generation-TTS cover)
22. "Gee" (Girls' Generation cover)
23. "U R"

Concert dates
Date	City	Country	Venue	Attendance
July 9, 2016	Seoul	South Korea	Olympic Hall	6,000
July 10, 2016	Seoul	South Korea	Olympic Hall	6,000
August 6, 2016	Busan	South Korea	KBS Busan Hall	5,694
August 7, 2016	Busan	South Korea	KBS Busan Hall	5,694

=== Taeyeon Special Live 'The Magic of Christmas Time' ===
Taeyeon Special Live 'The Magic of Christmas Time'
- Tour by Taeyeon
- Location: South Korea
- Associated album: This Christmas: Winter Is Coming
- Start date: December 22, 2017
- End date: December 24, 2017
- No. of shows: 3

Set list
1. "The Magic of Christmas Time"
2. "Christmas Without You"
3. "11:11"
4. "Eraser"
5. "Night"
6. "Shhh"
7. "Rain"
8. "Gemini"
9. "Let It Snow"
10. "Up & Down"
11. "Good Thing"
12. "Hands on Me"
13. "Cover Up"
14. "Why"
15. "Winter Story" (Girls' Generation-TTS cover)
16. "Have Yourself A Merry Little Christmas"
17. "Grown Up Christmas List" (Amy Grant cover)
18. "A Holly Jolly Christmas" (Burl Ives cover)
19. "I'm All Ears"

Encore

20. "Dear Santa"(Girls' Generation-TTS cover)
21. "Candy Cane"
22. "This Christmas"
23. "Curtain Call"
Notes
1. During the final show, Girls' Generation member Seohyun made a special guest and performed "Winter Story" and "Merry Christmas", songs by Girls' Generation-TTS, with Taeyeon.

Concert dates
Date	City	Country	Venue	Attendance
December 22, 2017	Seoul	South Korea	Kyung Hee University – Grand Peace Palace Hall	13,500
December 23, 2017	Seoul	South Korea	Kyung Hee University – Grand Peace Palace Hall	13,500
December 24, 2017	Seoul	South Korea	Kyung Hee University – Grand Peace Palace Hall	13,500

== Showcases ==
=== Taeyeon -Japan Show Case Tour 2018– ===
Set list
1. "I"
2. "Up & Down"
3. "Eraser"
4. "Night"
5. "I Got Love"
6. "Stay"
7. "Secret"
8. "U R"
9. "Rescue Me"
10. "Indestructible" (Girls' Generation cover)
11. "Time Lapse"
12. "Hands on Me"
13. "11:11"
14. "Why"

Encore

1. "I'm the Greatest"
2. "Fine"

Date	City	Country	Venue
June 15, 2018	Fukuoka	Japan	Fukuoka Sunpalace
June 19, 2018	Nagoya	Japan	Century Hall
June 20, 2018	Tokyo	Japan	NHK Hall
June 29, 2018	Osaka	Japan	Orix Theater

== Joint tours and concerts ==
Date	Location	Country	Event	Venue	Ref.
October 16, 2015	Seoul	South Korea	KBS Music Bank – 2015 Incheon SKY Festival Special	Incheon Airport	
March 25, 2016	Abu Dhabi	United Arab Emirates	KCON 2016 Abu Dhabi	Du Arena	
July 17–18, 2016	Osaka	Japan	SM Town Live World Tour V in Osaka	Kyocera Dome Osaka	
August 13–14, 2016	Tokyo	Japan	SM Town Live World Tour V in Tokyo	Tokyo Dome	
July 8, 2017	Seoul	South Korea	SM Town Live World Tour VI in Seoul	Seoul World Cup Stadium	
July 15–16, 2017	Osaka	Japan	SM Town Live World Tour VI in Osaka	Kyocera Dome Osaka	
July 27–28, 2017	Tokyo	Japan	SM Town Live World Tour VI in Tokyo	Tokyo Dome	
August 18, 2017	Jakarta	Indonesia	Countdown Asian Games 2018	National Monument	
September 15, 2017	Vancouver	Canada	Albatross Music Festival	Hastings Racecourse	
September 24, 2017	Busan	South Korea	2017 Asia Song Festival	Busan Asiad Main Stadium	
January 13, 2018	Kuala Lumpur	Malaysia	K-Wave 2 Music Festival 2018	Stadium Merdeka	
April 6, 2018	Dubai	United Arab Emirates	SM Town Live World Tour VI in Dubai	Autism Rocks Arena	
April 21–22, 2018	Taipei	Taiwan	2018 Best of Best Concert in Taipei	Nangang Exhibition Hall	
May 19, 2018	Chiba	Japan	Rakuten GirlsAward 2018 Spring-Summer	Makuhari Messe	
May 20, 2018	Hong Kong	China	Wonder K Concert	Hall 5BC, Hong Kong Convention and Exhibition Centre	
July 28–30, 2018	Osaka	Japan	SM Town Live 2018 In Osaka	Kyocera Dome Osaka	
September 9, 2018	Kallang	Singapore	2018 HallyuPopFest	Singapore Indoor Stadium	
May 19, 2019	Taipei	Taiwan	K-Pop Entertaining Music Festival	Nangang Exhibition Hall	
May 25, 2019	Seoul	South Korea	POSCO Concert: Mood_Full	POSCO Center	
July 6, 2019	Hong Kong	China	SBS Super Concert in Hong Kong	AsiaWorld-Expo	
July 28, 2019	Seoul	South Korea	Beanpole 30th Anniversary Concert "Now 30"	Jamsil Arena	
August 3-5, 2019	Tokyo	Japan	SM Town Live 2019 In Tokyo	Tokyo Dome	
October 19, 2019	Bangkok	Thailand	2019 Best of Best Concert in Bangkok	Thunder Dome	
January 1, 2021	Seoul	South Korea	SM Town Live Culture Humanity	Online live concert	
May 30, 2021	Seoul	South Korea	3rd Shiny Art Festival	Online concert	
January 1, 2022	Seoul	South Korea	SM Town Live 2022: SMCU Express at Kwangya	Online live concert	
August 20, 2022	Suwon	South Korea	SM Town Live 2022: SMCU Express at Human City Suwon	Suwon World Cup Stadium	
August 27–29, 2022	Tokyo	Japan	SM Town Live 2022: SMCU Express at Tokyo	Tokyo Dome	
October 1, 2022	Bangkok	Thailand	2022 Best of Best Concert in Bangkok	IMPACT Arena	
February 18, 2023	Paris	France	MIK Festival 2023 Paris	Accor Arena	
April 11, 2023	Manila	Philippines	The Ultimate Pop Universe: K-VERSE Concert	Araneta Coliseum	
February 21–22, 2024	Tokyo	Japan	SM Town Live 2024: SMCU Palace in Tokyo	Tokyo Dome	
May 12, 2024	Chiba	Japan	KCON Japan 2024	Zozo Marine Stadium	
May 18, 2024	Nonthaburi	Thailand	IKONYX CONCERT	Thunderdome Stadium	
August 31, 2024	Kaohsiung	Taiwan	ECO L!VE CONCERT	Kaohsiung Arena	
August 30, 2025	Ho Chi Minh City	Vietnam	THE K SHOWTIME	Van Phuc City	
October 19, 2025	Incheon	South Korea	MADLY MEDLEY	Paradise City	
May 10, 2026	Nonthaburi	Thailand	Annyeong, Bangkok Music Festival	Thunderdome Stadium	
May 30, 2026	Kaohsiung	Taiwan	K-SPARK in KAOHSIUNG	National Stadium	
August 23, 2026	Hong Kong	China	2026 TMElive International Music Awards	Kai Tak Stadium	
