= The Odd of Love =

2023 concert tour by Taeyeon

Taeyeon Concert - The Odd of Love
- Asia tour by Taeyeon
- Promotional poster of the tour in Seoul
- Location: Asia
- Associated album: INVU
- Start date: June 3, 2023
- End date: August 20, 2023
- Legs: 1
- No. of shows: 12

Taeyeon concert chronology
- The Unseen (2020); The Odd of Love (2023); The Tense (2025)

The Odd of Love (stylized as TAEYEON CONCERT - The ODD Of LOVE) was the fifth concert tour and the first arena tour headlined by South Korean singer Taeyeon, in support of her third studio album INVU (2022). The tour started in June 2023 in Seoul and finished in August 2023 in Singapore, visiting eight countries across Asia. It was her first solo concert in three years since The Unseen in 2020, which was cut short after three shows due to COVID-19.

== Background ==
On November 8, 2022, in her acceptance speech for Best Female Solo Artist Award at the 2022 Genie Music Awards ceremony, Taeyeon announced that she would hold a concert soon. SM Entertainment announced on May 5, 2023, that Taeyeon would hold her first solo concert in three years titled "The Odd of Love" at the KSPO Dome in South Korea, making Taeyeon the first South Korean female artist to headline a concert at the arena both as a solo artist and as a member of a group (Note: She previously performed at the venue as a member of Girls' Generation.) and the fifth South Korean female soloist to hold a concert at the venue after Patti Kim, BMK, Insooni and IU.

On May 9, 2023, SM announced Taeyeon would officially start the tour with shows in Hong Kong and Japan. In June 2023, SM announced that the tour would continue in other Asian countries, including Taiwan, Indonesia, the Philippines, Thailand, and Singapore. With her shows in Thailand, Taeyeon became the first South Korean female solo artist to headline a concert at the Impact Arena, the largest indoor-arena in the country. She also became the first South Korean female solo artist to headline concerts in Taiwan's Taipei Arena, Singapore's Indoor Stadium and the second South Korean female solo artist to hold a concert at an arena in Japan, following her label mate BoA.

== Commercial performance ==
=== Ticket sales ===
Ticket sales for the concerts in Seoul were split into a fan club pre-sale and a general sale. The fan club pre-sale began on May 12, while the general sale began on May 15. Online reservations could be made on Yes24 Ticket. All tickets were priced ₩154,000. On May 24, SM Entertainment announced that there was an explosive response after tickets opened and all seats for both days were sold out, including seats with obstructed views.

The concert in Seoul was attended by more than 18,000 people, including Girls' Generation's Seohyun, Yoona, Sooyoung, Hyoyeon and Tiffany, Doyoung, Seventeen's Seungkwan, Hoshi, Vernon and Dino, Le Sserafim, (G)I-dle, Aespa's Karina and Winter, Shinee's Key, Minho, and Taemin, Baek A-yeon, Sunday, Jewelry's Kim Eun-jung, Juniel, Son Na-eun, Lovelyz's Yein, Ive's Liz, Gaeul, Leeseo and An Yu-jin, Super Junior's Eunhyuk and Donghae, Hanhae, Code Kunst, Kim Jae-joong, Ahn Bo-hyun and Blackswan's Fatou.

Super Dome Taiwan recorded over 120,000 people accessing the ticketing website at the same time, the 12,000 seats at Taipei Arena were sold out within three minutes. The organizers added more seats with obstructed views and hundreds of people slept overnight from the previous day waiting to buy tickets directly for the seats in this area.

On July 16, SM True Thailand announced tickets for both shows in Bangkok were sold out, achieving a new record by being the first-ever South Korean female solo artist to successfully hold a two-day solo concert at Impact Arena. On July 19, DNM Entertainment Philippines stated unavailable seats with obstructed views would be opened for sale due to the high ticket demand.

On July 29, CK Star Entertainment Singapore announced tickets for the concert at Singapore Indoor Stadium were sold out. On August 3, CK Star Entertainment announced the addition of an exta show on August 19. On August 7, CK Star reported tickets for both shows in Singapore were sold out, this made Taeyeon the first-ever South Korean female solo artist to successfully hold a two-day solo concert at Singapore Indoor Stadium.

== Setlist ==
The following set list is from the concert on June 3, 2023, in Seoul, South Korea, and is not intended to represent all shows throughout the tour.

1. "INVU"
2. "Can’t Control Myself"
3. "Some Nights"
4. "Set Myself On Fire"
5. "Siren"
6. "Cold As Hell"
7. "Heart"
8. "Toddler"
9. "Weekend"
10. "No Love Again"
11. "You Better Not"
12. "Stress"
13. "Playlist"
14. "What Do I Call You"
15. "To The Moon"
16. "Wildfire"
17. "My Tragedy"
18. "Better Babe"
19. "Four Seasons"
20. "Timeless"
21. "Fine"
22. "I"
23. "Drawing Our Moments"

Encore:

24. "Spark"
25. "Ending Credits"

=== Notes ===
- At the Tokyo shows, "Drawing Our Moments" was replaced with "Voice".
- Started from the Tangerang show, "Drawing Our Moments" was replaced with "Time Lapse".

== Shows ==
Concert dates
| Date | City | Country | Venue | Attendance | Ref. |
|---|---|---|---|---|---|
| June 3, 2023 | Seoul | South Korea | KSPO Dome | 18,000 | |
| June 4, 2023 | Seoul | South Korea | KSPO Dome | 18,000 | |
| June 10, 2023 | Hong Kong | | AsiaWorld–Arena | 9,000 | |
| June 24, 2023 | Taipei | Taiwan | Taipei Arena | 12,000 | |
| July 8, 2023 | Tokyo | Japan | Tokyo Metropolitan Gymnasium | 16,000 | |
| July 9, 2023 | Tokyo | Japan | Tokyo Metropolitan Gymnasium | 16,000 | |
| July 22, 2023 | Jakarta | Indonesia | Indonesia Convention Exhibition | 9,000 | |
| July 30, 2023 | Manila | Philippines | Smart Araneta Coliseum | 8,000 | |
| August 12, 2023 | Bangkok | Thailand | Impact Arena | 18,000 | |
| August 13, 2023 | Bangkok | Thailand | Impact Arena | 18,000 | |
| August 19, 2023 | Singapore | | Singapore Indoor Stadium | 16,000 | |
| August 20, 2023 | Singapore | | Singapore Indoor Stadium | 16,000 | |
| Total | | | | 106,000 | |

== Personnel ==
- Artist: Taeyeon
- Tour organizers: SM Entertainment, Dream Maker Entertainment, SM True (Thailand), Dyandra Global Entertainment (Indonesia), Super Dome (Taiwan), G Music (Hong Kong), Sunny Side Up Entertainment Asia Limited (Hong Kong), Innotech Media Production (Hong Kong), Dragon Sky Production Limited (Hong Kong), Stars Legend Entertainment (Hong Kong), Richly Media Limited (Hong Kong), Aidou Infinite Entertainment (Hong Kong), DNM Entertainment (Philippines), IN2UNE Entertainment (Philippines), Viu (Singapore) and CK Star Entertainment (Singapore).
- Ticketing partners: Yes24 Ticket (South Korea), Cityline (Hong Kong), KKTIX (Taiwan), Ticket Board (Japan), Loket (Indonesia), TicketNet (Philippines), Ticketmaster (Singapore) and All Ticket by 7-Eleven (Thailand)

== Footnotes ==
Show details
