= Jamsil Arena =

Sports venue in Seoul, South Korea

- Jamsil Indoor Stadium
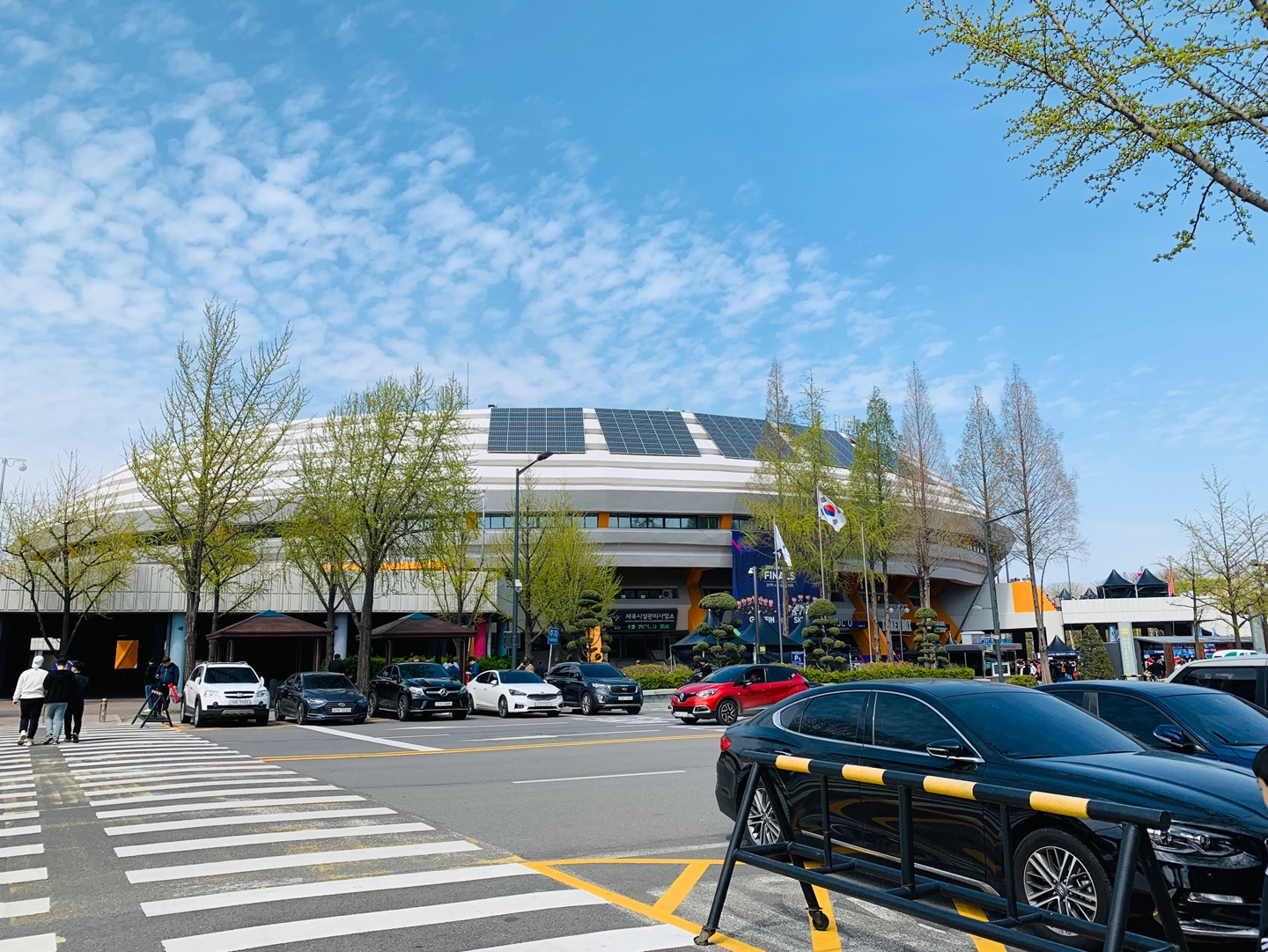
- Jamsil Arena in 2019
- Interactive map of Jamsil Arena
- Location: Seoul, South Korea
- Coordinates: 37.516364°N 127.075958°E
- Operator: City of Seoul
- Capacity: 11,069

Construction
- Groundbreaking: 1 December 1976
- Opened: 18 April 1979
- Cost: 5.4 billion won

Tenants
- Seoul Samsung Thunders (2001–present); Seoul SK Knights (2001–2004); 1988 Summer Olympic Games

- Jamsil Arena
- Hangul: 잠실체육관
- Hanja: 蠶室體育館
- RR: Jamsil cheyukgwan
- MR: Chamsil ch'eyukkwan

Jamsil Arena (Korean: 잠실체육관), a.k.a. Jamsil Indoor Stadium, is an indoor sporting arena. It is part of Seoul Sports Complex, located in Seoul, South Korea. The capacity of the arena is 11,069 for basketball was built from December 1976 to April 1979. The Seoul Samsung Thunders are the tenants.

== Notable events ==
Overhead view of Jamsil Arena

Jamsil Arena hosted the basketball events and volleyball finals during the 1988 Summer Olympics.

It has also been used to host various entertainment events, to include World Wrestling Entertainment (WWE) events and concerts, by Iron Maiden, Alicia Keys, Mariah Carey, Muse, Nine Inch Nails, Incubus, and Japanese band L'Arc-en-Ciel, among others.

=== 2001 ===
- Westlife: Where Dreams Come True Tour – 31 May 2001

=== 2003 ===
- Mariah Carey: Charmbracelet World Tour – 20 June 2003

=== 2007 ===
- Muse: Black Holes and Revelations Tour – 7 March 2007

=== 2011 ===
- Sting kicked off the Asian leg of his Symphonicities Tour here on January 11, 2011, along with the Royal Philharmonic Orchestra.
- 2PM: 2PM "Hands Up" Asia Tour – 2 and 3 September 2011

=== 2012 ===
- Kim Junsu: XIA 1st World Tour Concert – 19 May 2012
- Wonder Girls: Wonder World Tour – 7 July 2012

=== 2013 ===
- 2PM: 2PM Live Tour in Seoul – "What Time Is It" – The Grand Finale – 21 and 22 June 2013
- DSP Media: DSP Festival – 14 December 2013

=== 2014 ===
- 23rd Seoul Music Awards – 23 January 2014
- Super Junior: Super Show 6 – 19, 20 and 21 September 2014
- 2PM: 2PM World Tour "GO CRAZY!" – 3 and 4 October 2014

=== 2015 ===
- FNC Kingdom in Seoul: F.T. Island, CNBLUE, Juniel, N.Flying, AOA – 2 & 3 May 2015
- Apink: Apink second Concert "Pink Island" – 22 and 23 August 2015
- CNBLUE 2015 CNBLUE LIVE [COME TOGETHER] in Seoul – 24 and 25 October 2015

=== 2016 ===
- BtoB: 2016 BtoB Born to Beat Time Encore – 26 and 27 March 2016
- Wheesung & K.Will: 2016 Wheesung & K.Will Tour [Bromance Show] in Seoul – 30 April 2016
- Seventeen: Like Seventeen "Shining Diamond" Concert – 30 and 31 July 2016
- JYP Nation "MIX & MATCH" 2016 in South Korea: J.Y. Park, Wonder Girls, Jo Kwon, 2PM, Min, Fei, Baek A-yeon, Park Ji-min, Got7, Bernard Park, G.Soul, DAY6, Twice – 6 and 7 August 2016

=== 2017 ===
- 26th Seoul Music Awards – 19 January 2017
- Sechs Kies: Yellow Note Final In Seoul – 21 and 22 January 2017
- 6th Gaon Chart Music Awards – 22 February 2017
- VIXX: VIXX Live Fantasia – 12, 13 and 14 May 2017
- Highlight: Highlight Live 2017 – Can You Feel It? – 2, 3 and 4 June 2017
- Twice: Twice 1st Tour – Twiceland – The Opening - Encore – 17 and 18 June 2017
- Brian McKnight: SUPERSTAGE Concert with Ailee and Zion.T – 21 June 2017
- Taeyang: White Night World Tour – 26 and 27 August 2017
- With, Antenna: Toy, Jung Jae-hyung, Lucid Fall, Peppertones, Park Sae-byul, Lee Jin-ah, Chai, Jung Seung-hwan, Kwon Jin-ah, Sam Kim – 2 and 3 September
- Taemin: Taemin 1st Solo Concert "OFF-SICK〈on track〉" – 14 and 15 October 2017
- IU: 2017 IU Tour Concert 〈Palette〉 – 9 and 10 December 2017
- Super Junior: Super Show 7 – 15, 16 and 17 December 2017
- Highlight: Highlight Live 2017 – Celebrate – 21, 22 and 23 December 2017

=== 2018 ===
- 7th Gaon Chart Music Awards – 14 February 2018
- Got7: Got7 2018 Eyes On You Tour – 4, 5 and 6 May 2018
- Twice: Twice 2nd Tour – Twiceland Zone 2 – Fantasy Park – 18, 19 and 20 May 2018
- Seventeen: Ideal Cut – 28, 29, 30 June and 1 July
- Taeyeon: 's...Taeyeon Concert – 20 and 21 October 2018

=== 2019 ===
- 8th Gaon Chart Music Awards – 23 January 2019
- Z-Pop Dream Live in Seoul – 23 February 2019
- Taeyeon: 's...one TAEYEON CONCERT (2019) – 23 and 24 March 2019
- 2019 LCK Spring Finals – 13 April
- Iz*One: Iz*One 1st Concert "Eyes On Me" in Seoul – 7, 8 and 9 June 2019
- Day6: You Made My Day Ep.2 Scentographer – 29 June 2019
- Day6: World Tour "Gravity" – 9, 10 and 11 August 2019

=== 2020 ===
- 9th Gaon Chart Music Awards – 8 January 2020

=== 2021 ===
- NU'EST: "The Black" Concert – 26, 27 and 28 November 2021

=== 2022 ===
- Exo: 2022 Debut Anniversary Fan Event: EXO – 9 April 2022
- Stray Kids: Stray Kids 2nd World Tour "Maniac" – 29, 30 April and 1 May 2022
- Highlight: Highlight Live 2022 [Intro] – 20, 21 and 22 May 2022
- ASTRO: The 3rd ASTROAD 'STARGAZER' – 28, 29 May 2022
- 28th SBS Dream Concert - 18 June 2022
- Tomorrow x Together : Tomorrow x Together World Tour "Act: Lovesick" – 2 and 3 July 2022
- Super Junior: Super Show 9: Road – 15, 16 and 17 July 2022
- Ateez: The Fellowship: Break The Wall – 29 and 30 October 2022
- The Boyz: 2022 The Boyz Fan-Con: The B-Road – 2 and 3 December 2022

=== 2023 ===
- Aespa: 1st Concert 'SYNK : Hyper Line' – 25 and 26 February 2023
- League of Legends Champions Korea 2023 Spring Season Playoffs – 8 and 9 April 2023
- Super Junior: Super Show 9: Road Show – 15 and 16 April 2023
- Boys Planet: Finale – 20 April 2023
- Peak Time: Peak Time Concert "YOUR TIME" – 5, 6 and 7 May 2023
- Shinee: 2023 Shinee Fanmeeting: Every Day is Shinee Day "Piece of Shinee" – 27 and 28 May 2023
- (G)I-dle: 2023 (G)I-dle World Tour: I am FREE-TY – 17 and 18 June 2023
- Suga: Agust D Tour: D-Day – 24 and 25 June 2023
- NCT 127: 7th Anniversary Fanmeeting "ONCE UPON A 7ULY" – 16 July 2023
- NCT Dream: 7th Anniversary Fanmmeting "Dream Land" – 22 July 2023
- Le Sserafim: 2023 Le Sserafim Tour "Flame Rises" – 12 and 13 August 2023
- Ive: 2023 Ive The 1st World Tour "Show What I Have" – 7 and 8 October 2023
- K-link Festival 2023 – 10 December 2023

=== 2024 ===
- Woodz: WOODZ World Tour OO-LI FINALE – 19 January 2024
- Ateez: Towards The Light: Will To Power – 27 and 28 January 2024
- Itzy: 2nd World Tour <Born to Be> – 24 and 25 February 2024
- Day6: DAY6 Concert <Welcome to the Show> – 12, 13 and 14 April 2024
- Riize: 2024 Riize Fan-con Tour "Riizing Day" – 4 and 5 May 2024
- Le Sserafim: Le Sserafim Fan Meeting "Fearnada" 2024 S/S - 11 and 12 May 2024
- Day6: DAY6 3rd Fanmeeting 'I Need My Day' – 21, 22 and 23 June 2024
- Aespa: Synk: Parallel Line – 29 and 30 June 2024
- NCT 127: 8th Anniversary Fanmeeting "8ecret Invitation" - 3 and 4 August 2024
- AJR: The Maybe Man Tour – 20 August 2024
- 2024 K-World Dream Awards – 22 August 2024
- Jannabi: Fantastic Old Fashioned 2024: Movie Star Rising – 31 August, 1, 7 and 8 September 2024
- D.O. : Bloom (The Final) – 11, 12 and 13 September 2024
- Olivia Rodrigo: Guts World Tour – 20 and 21 September 2024
- Baekhyun: 2024 Baekhyun Christmas Fanmeeting <Chaotic Party> – 21 and 22 December 2024

=== 2025 ===
- Kwon Jin-ah: [The Dreamest] Concert – 10 and 11 May
- &Team: Awaken the Bloodline Asia Tour – 7 and 8 June
- Doyoung: [ Doors ] Concert – 13, 14 and 15 June
- TWS: '24/7:WITH:US' Tour – 20, 21 and 22 June
- Jin: RunSeokjin Ep. Tour – 28 and 29 June
- Hoshi X Woozi: Warning Tour – 11, 12 and 13 July
- Day6: 4th Fanmeeting〈PIER 10: All My Days〉– 18, 19, 20, 25, 26 and 27 July
- 2025 K-World Dream Awards – 21 August
- Woodz: 2025 WOODZ PREVIEW CONCERT: index_00 – 29 and 30 November
- Crush: [CRUSH H★UR] Concert – 19, 20 and 21 December

=== 2026 ===
- Le Sserafim: Le Sserafim Tour "Easy Crazy Hot" Encore – 31 January and 1 February
- Itzy: 3rd World Tour <Tunnel Vision> – 13, 14 and 15 February
- OneRepublic: From Asia, With Love Tour – 23 February
- One Ok Rock: Detox Asia Tour – 27 and 28 February
- Wonpil: Wonpil Solo Concert "Unpiltered" - 1, 2 and 3 May
- And2ble: Welcome to Qurious - 19, 20 and 21 June
- Babymonster: Choom World Tour – 26, 27 and 28 June

== Gallery ==
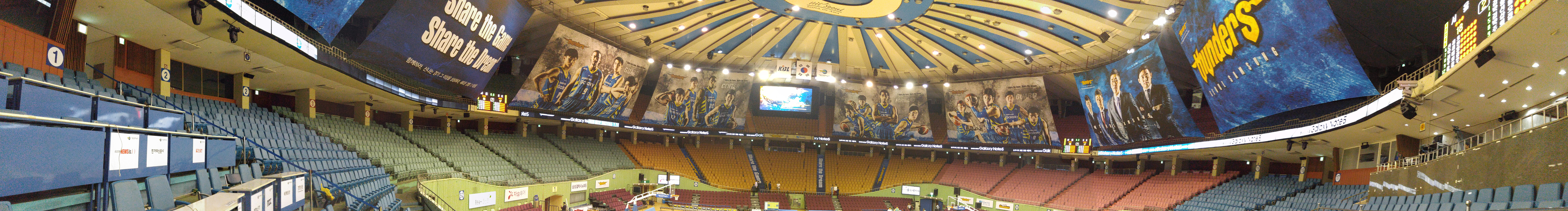
Jamsil Arena

== See also ==
- List of indoor arenas in South Korea
- New Millennium Hall, Konkuk University
