= I Got Love (Taeyeon song) =

Song by Taeyeon

from the album My Voice
- Released: February 17, 2017
- Genre: R&B; pop; trap
- Length: 3:10
- Label: SM
- Composers: Kenzie; Thomas Troelsen; Eyelar Mirzazadeh
- Lyricist: Kenzie
- Producers: Kenzie; Thomas Troelsen

Music video
- "I Got Love" on YouTube

"I Got Love" is a single recorded by South Korean singer Taeyeon for her first studio album My Voice (2017). The song was described as a pop and R&B song with elements of trap.

A music video for the song was released on February 17, 2017, as a promotional tool for My Voice, while the song itself was released digitally in conjunction with the release of the album on February 28. "I Got Love" received positive reviews from music critics, who noted its styles for being experimental and showcasing Taeyeon's unique vocals. The song peaked at number 20 on South Korea's Gaon Digital Chart and accumulated over one million streams within its first week of release. It additionally charted at number 9 on the Billboard World Digital Songs.

== Background ==
Since debuting as a soloist in October 2015 with the successful extended plays I and Why as well as chart-topping digital singles "Rain" and "11:11", South Korean singer Kim Tae-yeon (known by her mononym Taeyeon) has risen to prominence and established herself as the country's most popular individual celebrity of 2016. On February 14, 2017, Taeyeon's agency S.M. Entertainment announced that her first full-length studio album would be released in the end of February. A day later, the agency released promotional photos and a short trailer of the music video for a new song titled "I Got Love", which was set to be the album's pre-released track.

== Composition ==
"I Got Love" was described by S.M. Entertainment as an "urban R&B" song. Meanwhile, Billboard's Tamar Herman described it as a pop number with influences from trap and R&B.

The song's lyrics were written by Kenzie, who also composed its music with Thomas Troelsen and Eyelar Mirzazadeh. The song was produced by Kenzie and Troelsen, while Troelsen and Eyelar handled the arrangement.

== Reception ==
Tamar Herman from Billboard opined that "I Got Love" helped showcase "a more mature side" of Taeyeon as its "atypical" musical styles focus more on Taeyeon's "impassioned performance and lyrics", as opposed to her "sentimental side" as showcased through previous releases including "I" and "11:11". The Star's Chester Chin were positive towards the song's experimental styles, writing that it "sheds light on a fierce and sassy pop star".

"I Got Love" debuted at number 20 on the Gaon Digital Chart for the week ending March 4, 2017. Within its first week of release, the song sold 75,233 digital units and gained 1,071,722 streams through South Korean online music services. The following week, "I Got Love" dropped 51 positions and charted at number 71 on the Gaon Digital Chart, accumulating 23,153 downloads and 905,873 streams. The song additionally debuted at number 9 on the Billboard World Digital Songs.

== Credits and personnel ==
Credits are adapted from the CD booklet of My Voice.

Studio

- SM Big Shot Studio – recording, digital editing
- SM Yellow Tail Studio – mixing
- Sterling Sound – mastering

Personnel

- SM Entertainment – executive producer
- Lee Soo-man – producer
- Taeyeon – vocals, background vocals
- Kenzie – producer, lyrics, composition, vocal directing
- Thomas Troelsen – producer, composition, arrangement
- Eyelar Mirzazadeh – composition, arrangement
- Lee Min-kyu – recording, digital editing
- Koo Jong-pil – mixing
- Tom Coyne – mastering

== Charts ==
| Chart (2017) | Peak position |
|---|---|
| South Korea (Gaon) | 20 |
| US World Digital Songs (Billboard) | 9 |

== Sales ==
| Region | Sales |
|---|---|
| South Korea (Gaon) | 98,386 |
