= Make Me Love You (song) =

Single by Taeyeon

from the album My Voice
- Released: April 5, 2017
- Genre: R&B; pop
- Length: 3:33
- Label: SM Entertainment
- Composers: Aaron Benward; Matthew Tishler; Felicia Barton
- Lyricist: Jo Yoon-kyung

Taeyeon singles chronology
"Fine" (2017)	"Make Me Love You" (2017)	"Lonely" (2017)

Music video
- "Make Me Love You" on YouTube

"Make Me Love You" is a song recorded by South Korean singer Taeyeon. It was released as a single on April 5, 2017, by SM Entertainment. The song's lyrics were penned by Jo Yoon-kyung while its music was composed by Matthew Tishler, Felicia Barton and Aaron Benward. The song is the title track of the Deluxe edition of Taeyeon's first studio album, My Voice, which was released on the same day.

== Background and release ==
On April 5, 2017, SM Entertainment released the deluxe edition of Taeyeon's first album My Voice, along with a music video for the title song "Make Me Love You". The song is described as a R&B pop song that would warm up the spring season with her charming tone and soulful vocals. The song was included on the setlist of Taeyeon's first Asia tours concert "Persona", taking place in Seoul (South Korea), Taipei (Taiwan), Bangkok (Thailand) and Hong Kong in May and June 2017. Taeyeon also performed "Make Me Love You" live in front of over 30,000 audiences at Busan Asiad Main Stadium during 2017 Asia Song Festival on September 24, 2017.

== Reception ==
"Make Me Love You" debuted at number 4 on South Korea's Gaon Digital Chart for the chart issue dated April 2–8, 2017. It additionally peaked at number 11 on the Billboard World Digital Songs chart.

== Credits and personnel ==
Credits are adapted from the CD booklet of My Voice (Deluxe edition).

Studio

- In Grid Studio – recording
- Doobdoob Studio – digital editing
- SM Blue Cup Studio – mixing
- Sterling Sound – mastering

Personnel

- SM Entertainment – executive producer
- Lee Soo-man – producer
- Taeyeon – vocals, background vocals
- Jo Yoon-kyung – lyrics
- Matthew Tishler – composition, arrangement
- Felicia Barton – composition, arrangement, background vocals
- Aaron Benward – composition, arrangement
- G-High – vocal directing, Pro Tools operating
- Jeong Eun-kyung – recording
- Jang Woo-young – digital editing
- Jung Eui-seok – mixing
- Tom Coyne – mastering

== Charts ==
=== Weekly charts ===
Chart (2017)	Peak position
South Korean Singles (Gaon)	4
US World Digital Songs (Billboard)	11
Billboard (K-pop Hot 100)	58

=== Monthly charts ===
Chart (2017)	Peak position
South Korean Albums (Gaon)	8

== Sales ==
Region	Sales
South Korea	447,673+

== Release history ==
Region	Date	Format	Label
Worldwide	April 5, 2017	Digital download	SM Entertainment
