= List of M Countdown Chart winners (2017) =

Winners of South Korean music program M Countdown

M Countdown Chart winners (2017)

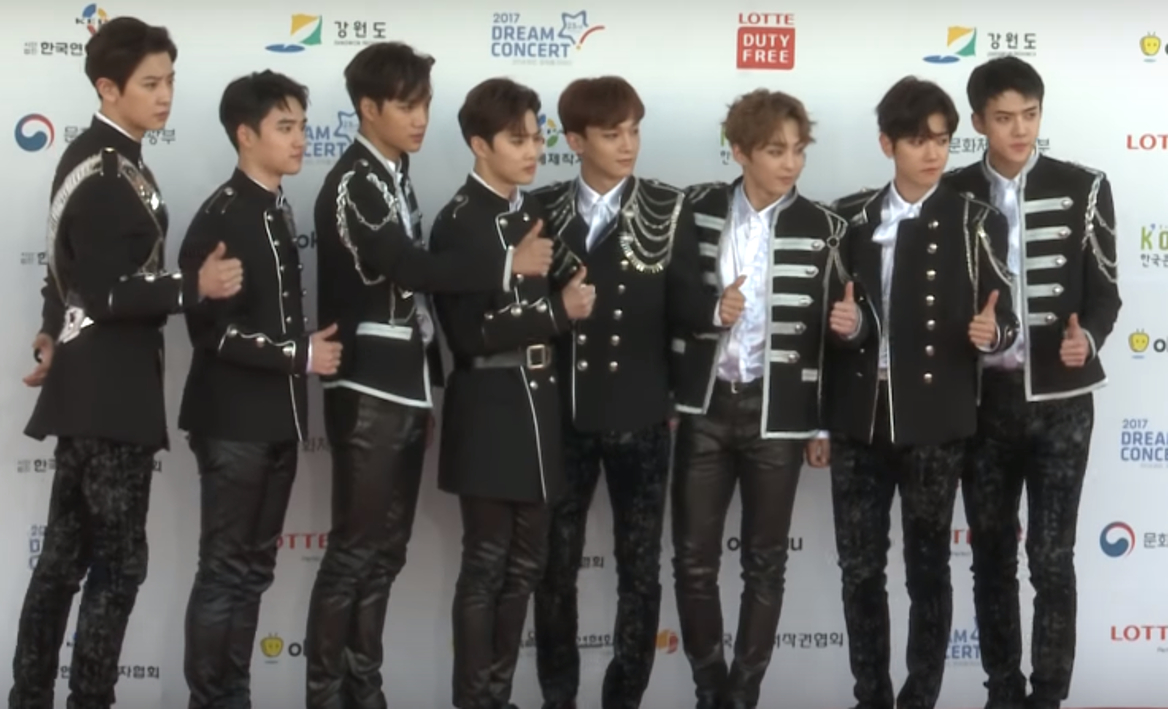
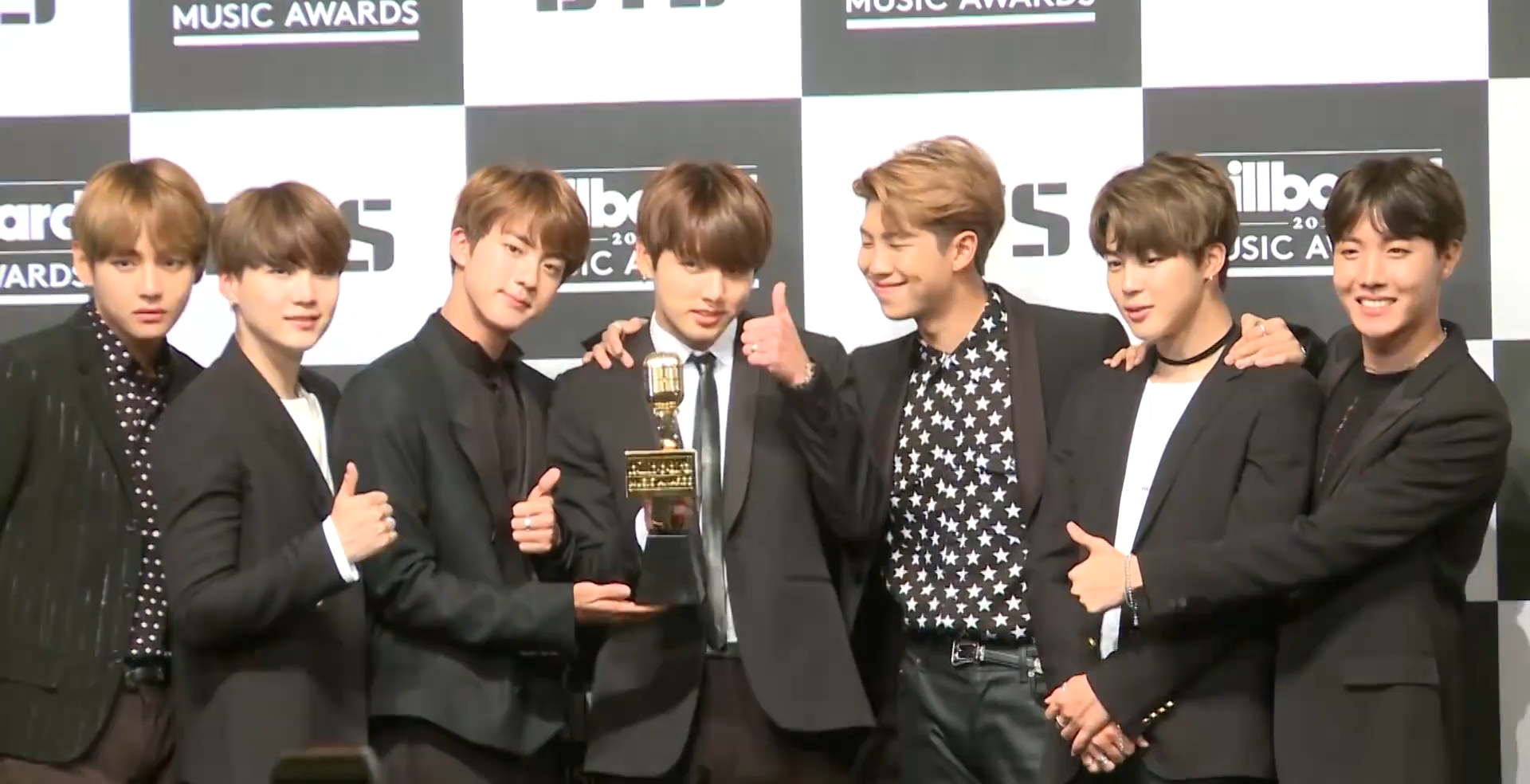
Exo (top) and BTS (bottom) earned the only perfect scores of the year for their singles "Power" and "DNA", on episodes 541 and 543 respectively.

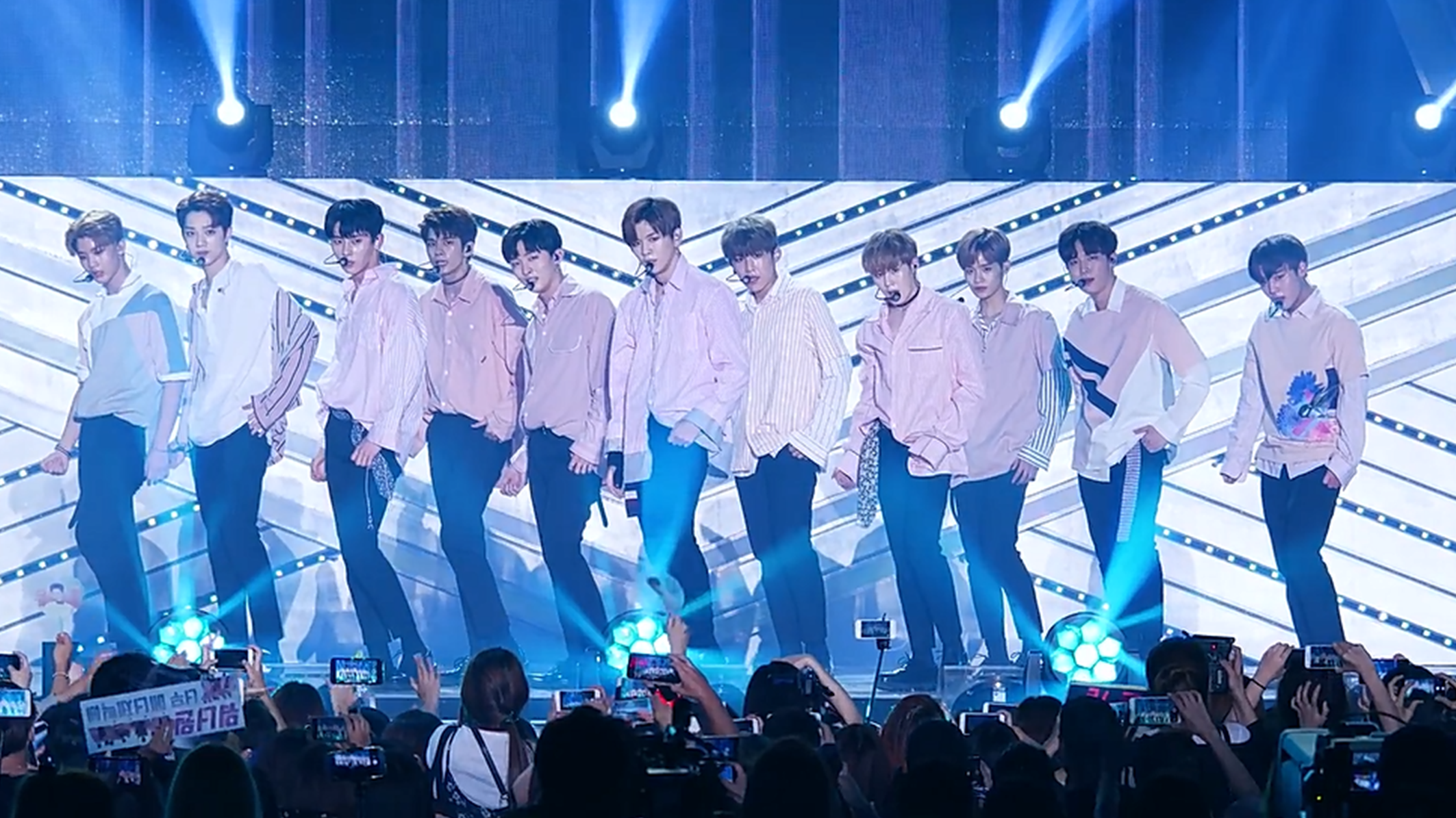
Wanna One received their first M Countdown trophy for their debut single "Energetic". The song subsequently achieved a triple crown.

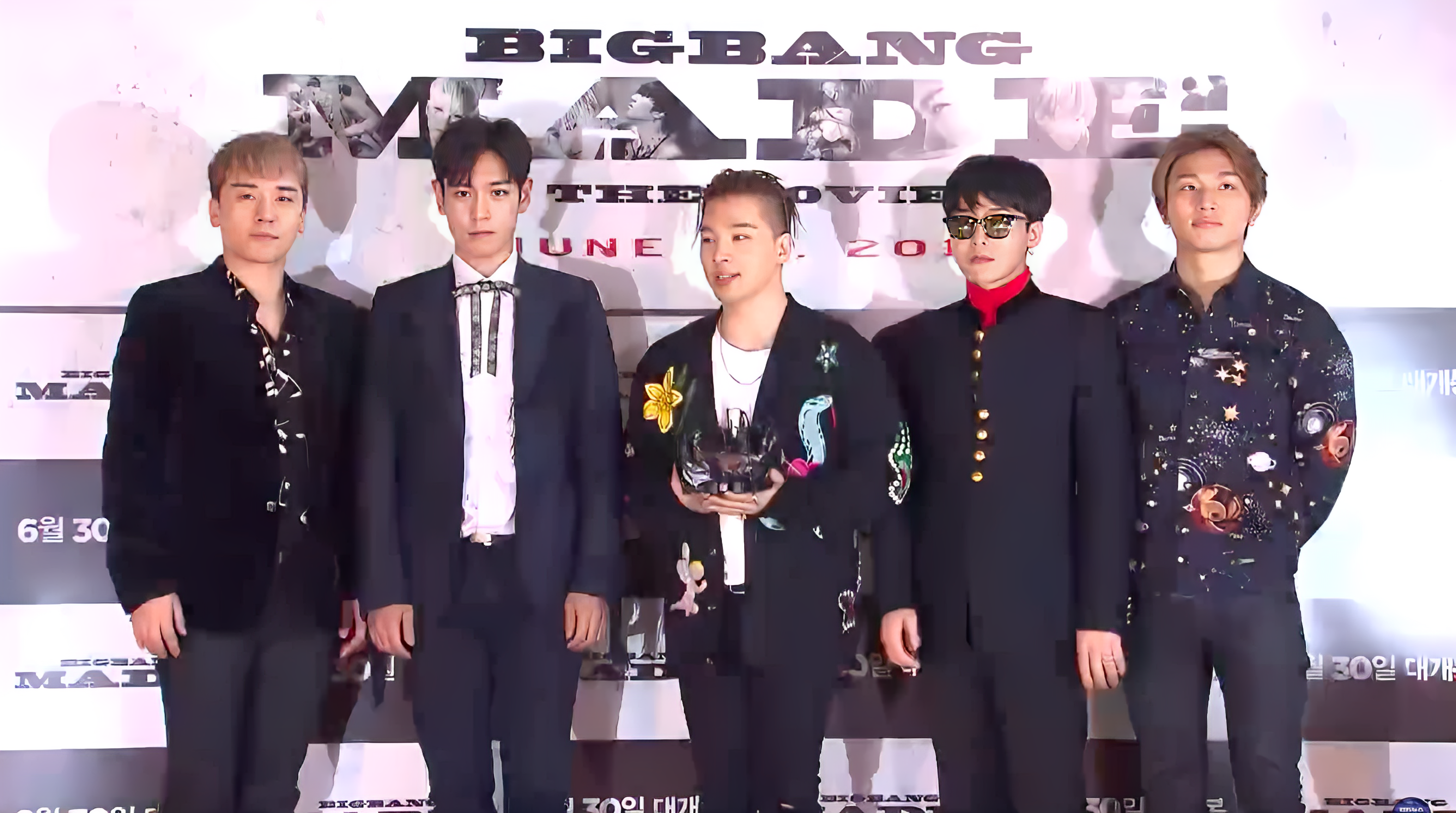
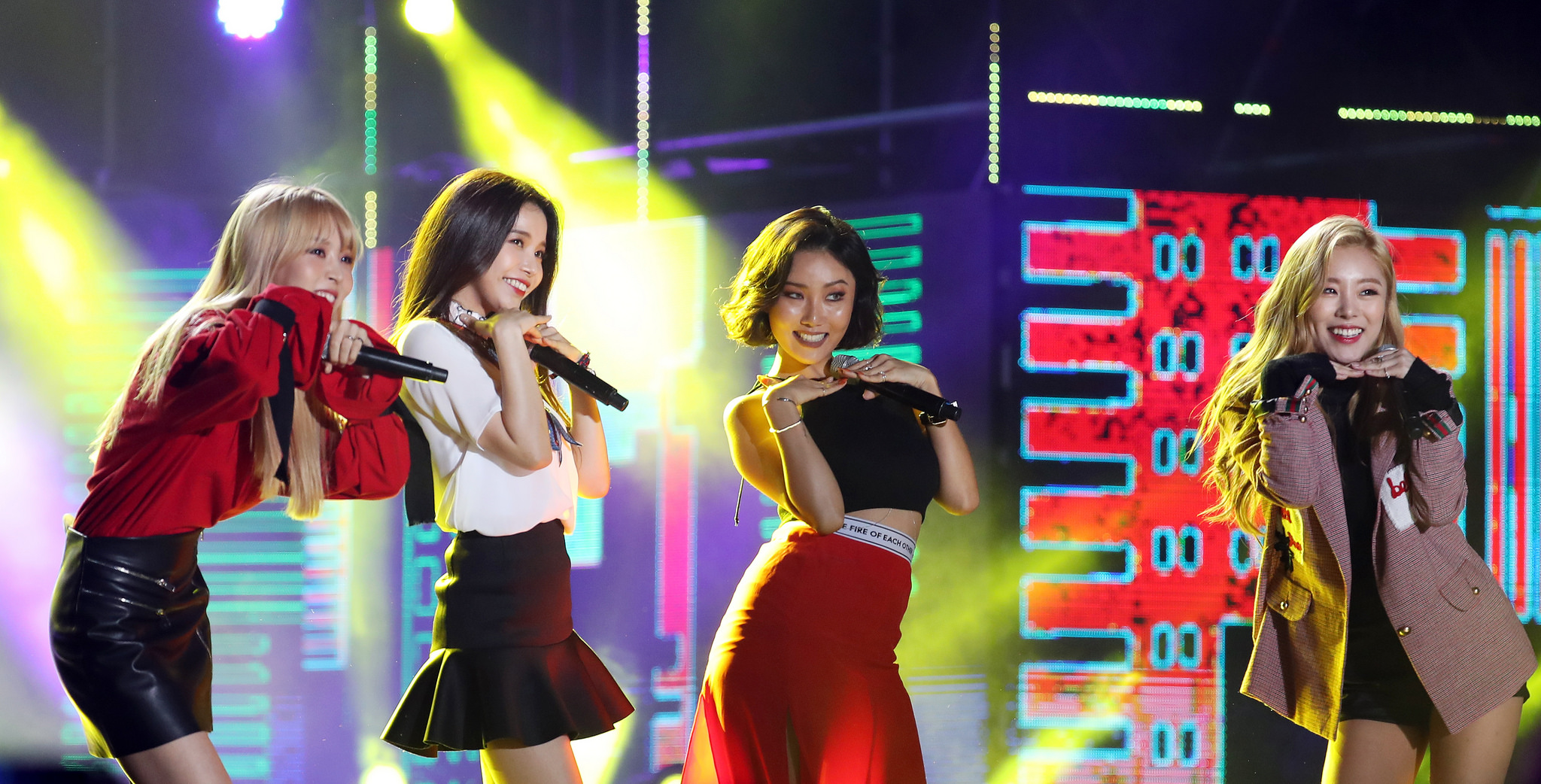
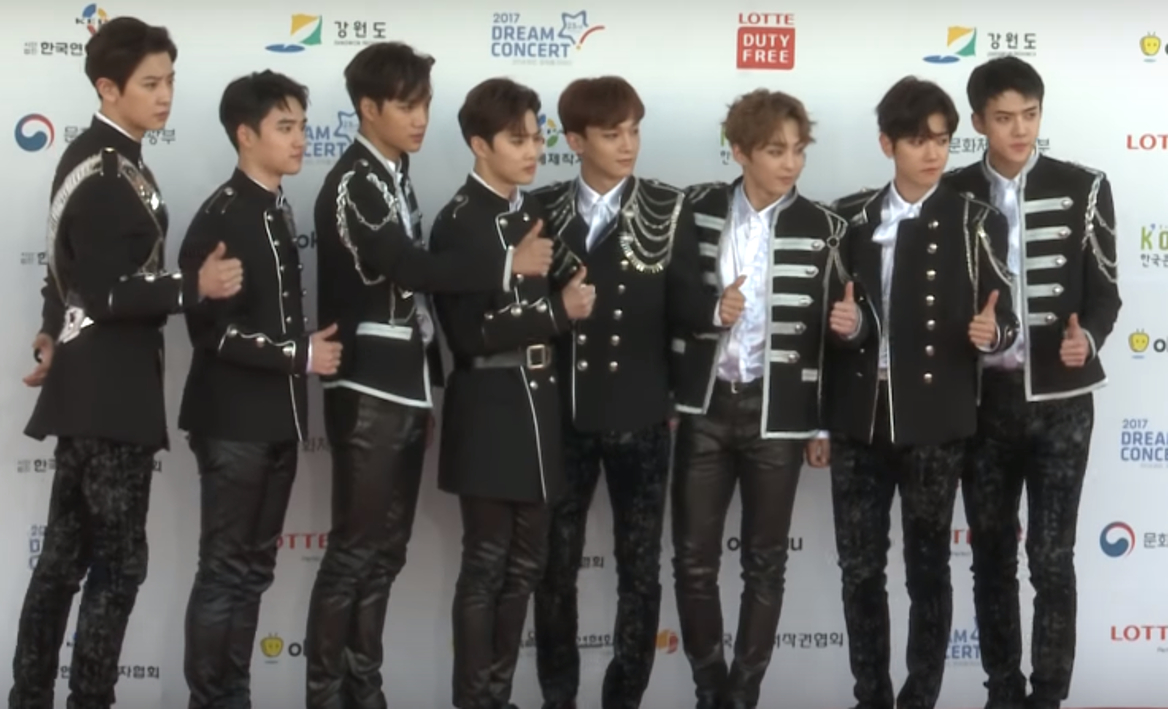
"Fxxk It" by Big Bang (top), "Yes I Am" by Mamamoo (center), and "Ko Ko Bop" by Exo (bottom) achieved the only other triple crowns of the year.

The M Countdown Chart is a record chart on the South Korean Mnet television music program M Countdown. Every week, the show awards the best-performing single on the chart in the country during its live broadcast.

In 2017, 31 singles ranked number one on the chart and 23 music acts were awarded first-place trophies. Four songs collected trophies for three weeks and achieved a triple crown: "Fxxk It" by Big Bang, "Yes I Am" by Mamamoo, "Ko Ko Bop" by Exo, and "Energetic" by Wanna One. Of all releases for the year, only two songs earned a perfect score of 11,000 points: "Power" by Exo and "DNA" by BTS.

== Scoring system ==
Songs were judged based on a combination of digital music sales (50%), album sales (15%), social media performance (official YouTube music video views and SNS buzz: 15%), popularity (global fan votes and age range preference) (10%), Mnet's broadcast score (10%), and SMS voting (10%).

== Chart history ==
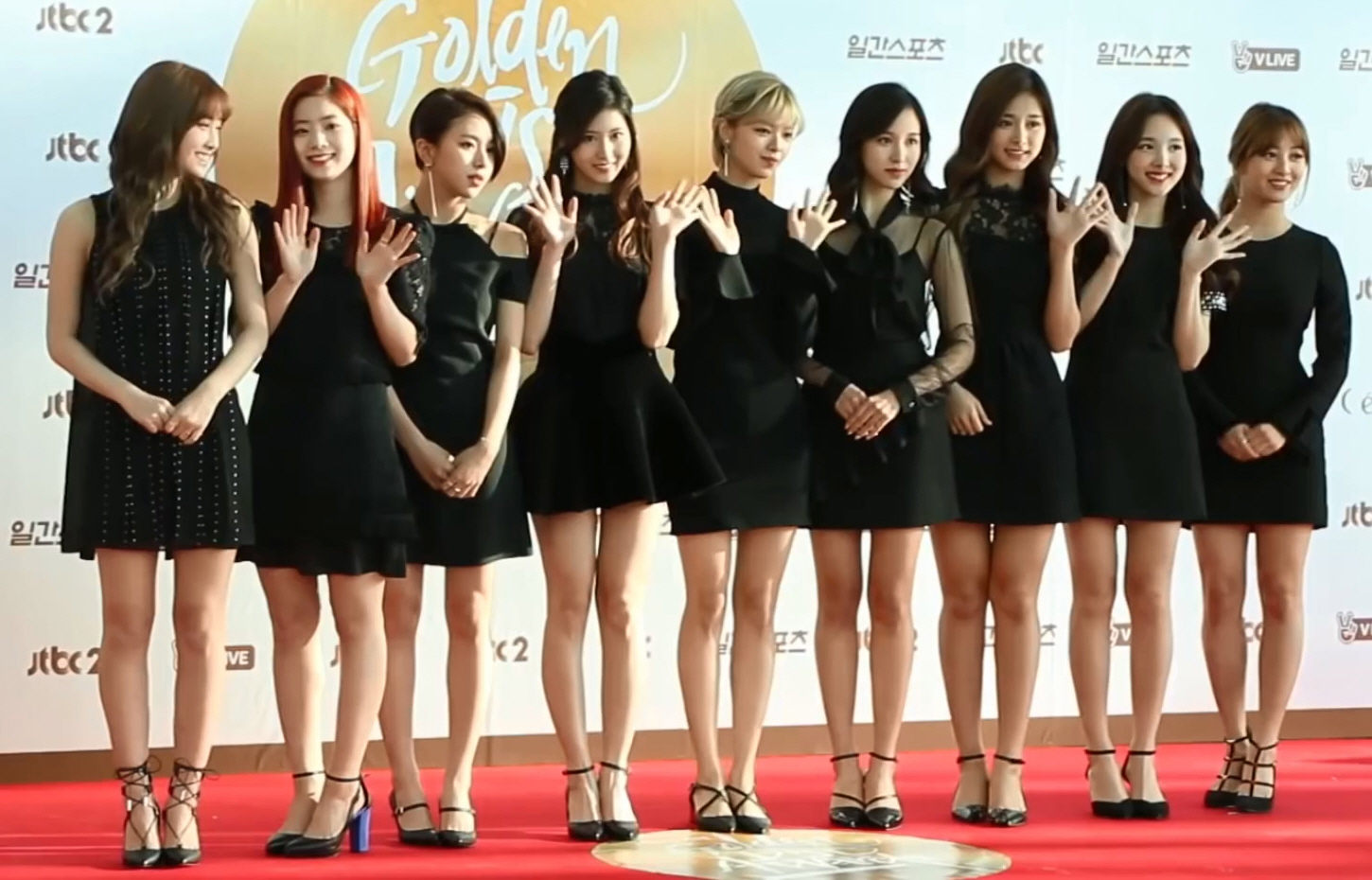
Twice ranked four singles at number one, with each single achieving two wins for a total of eight wins, the most of any act in 2017.

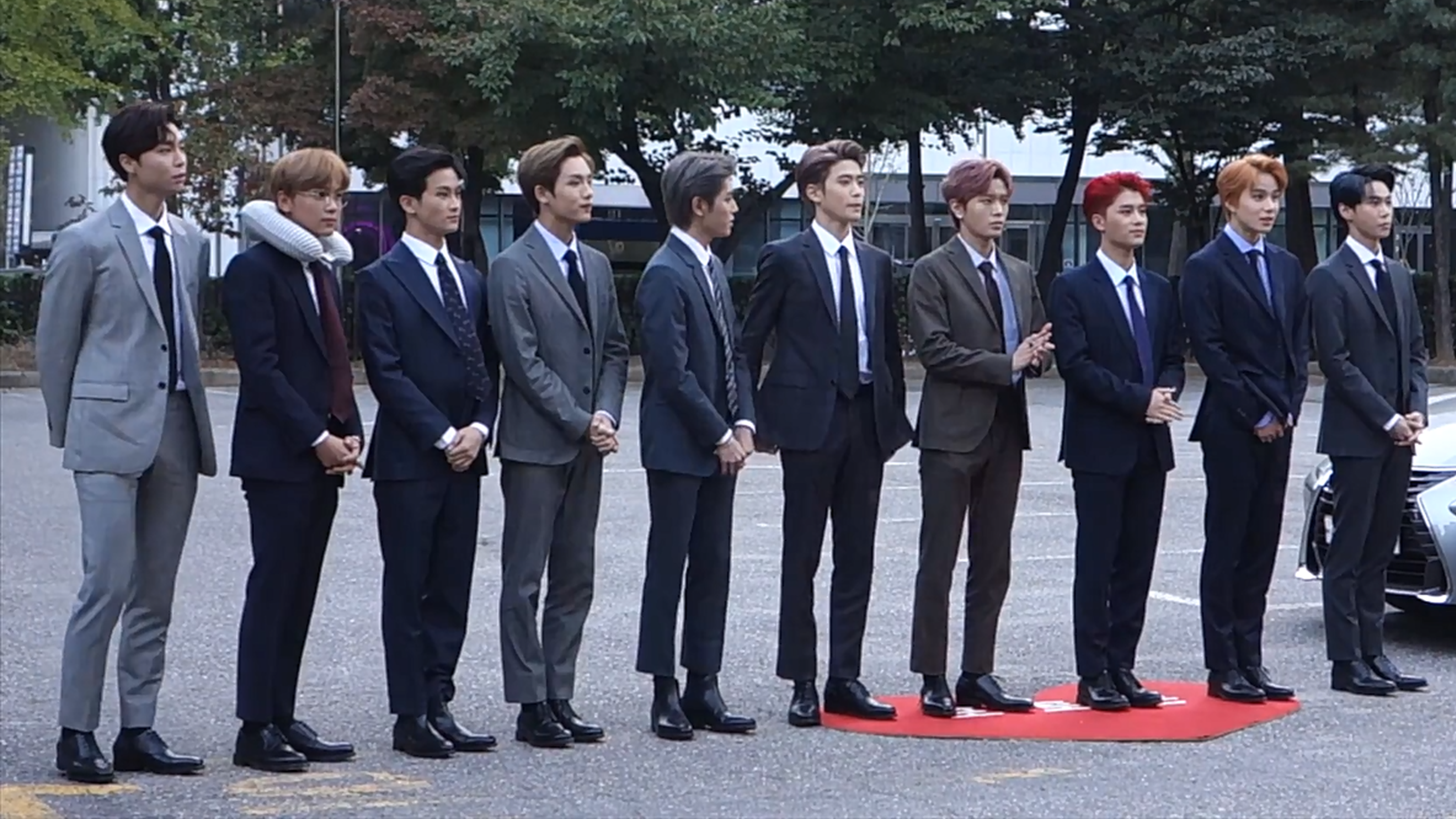
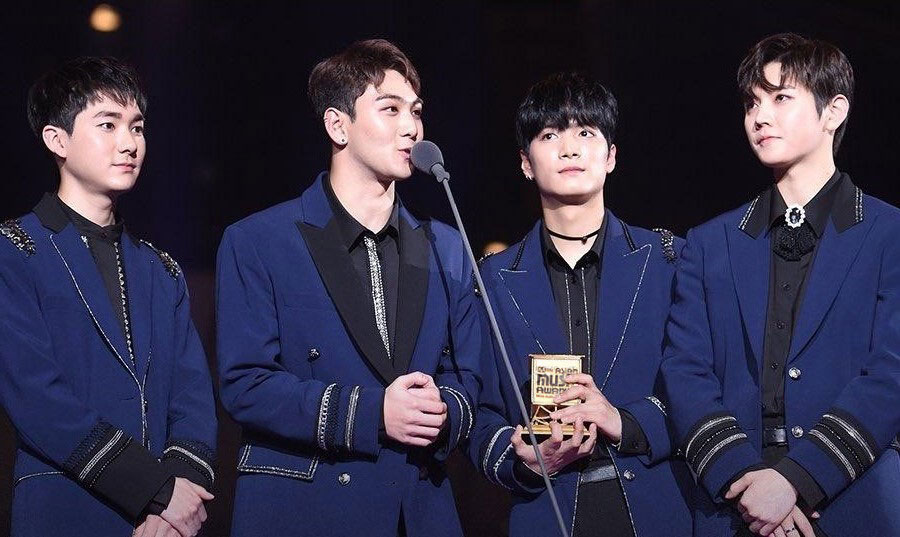
Sub-unit acts NCT 127 (top) and NU'EST W (bottom) both achieved their first ever music show win with "Cherry Bomb" on episode 529 and "Where You At" on episode 545 respectively.
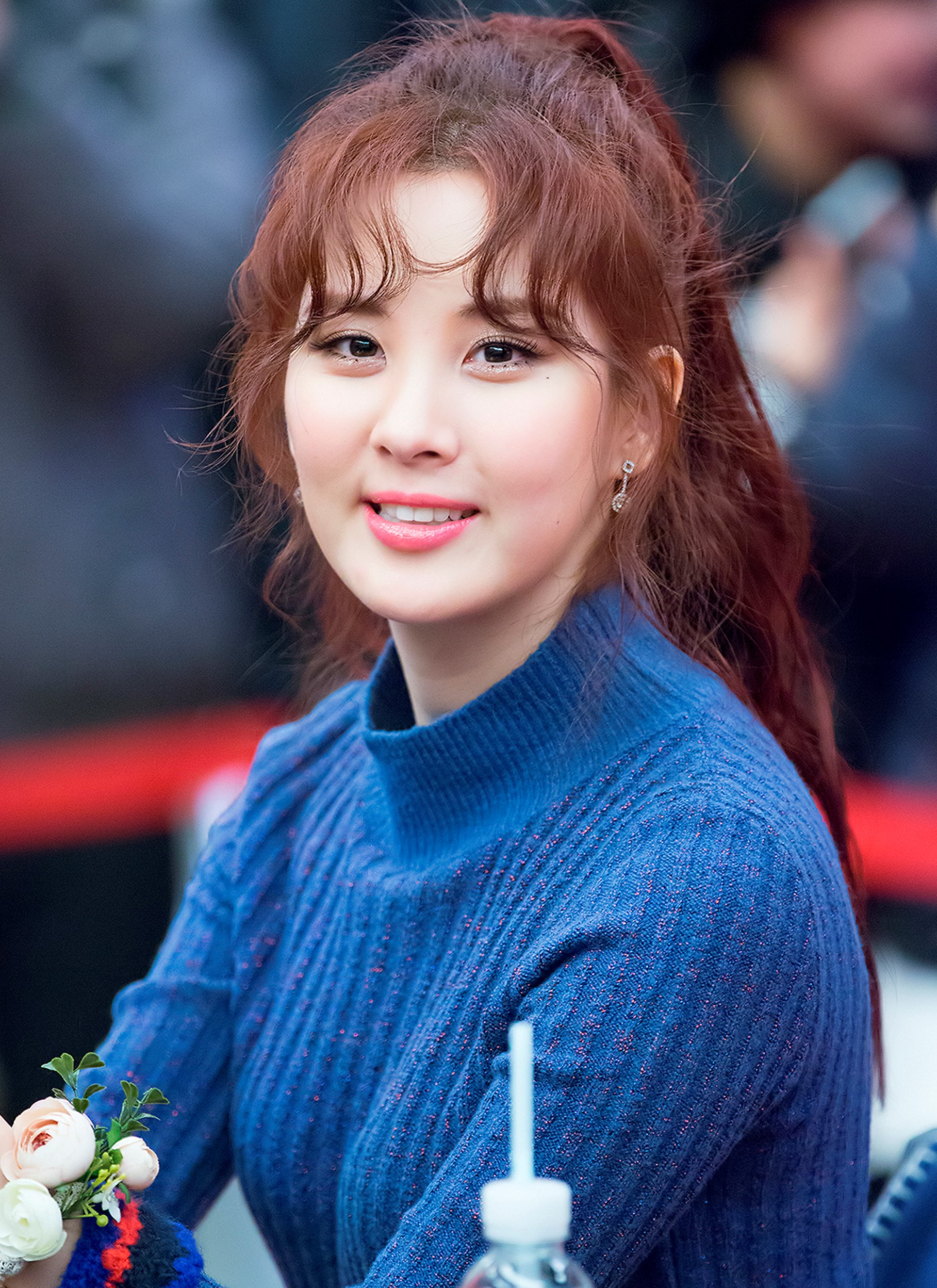
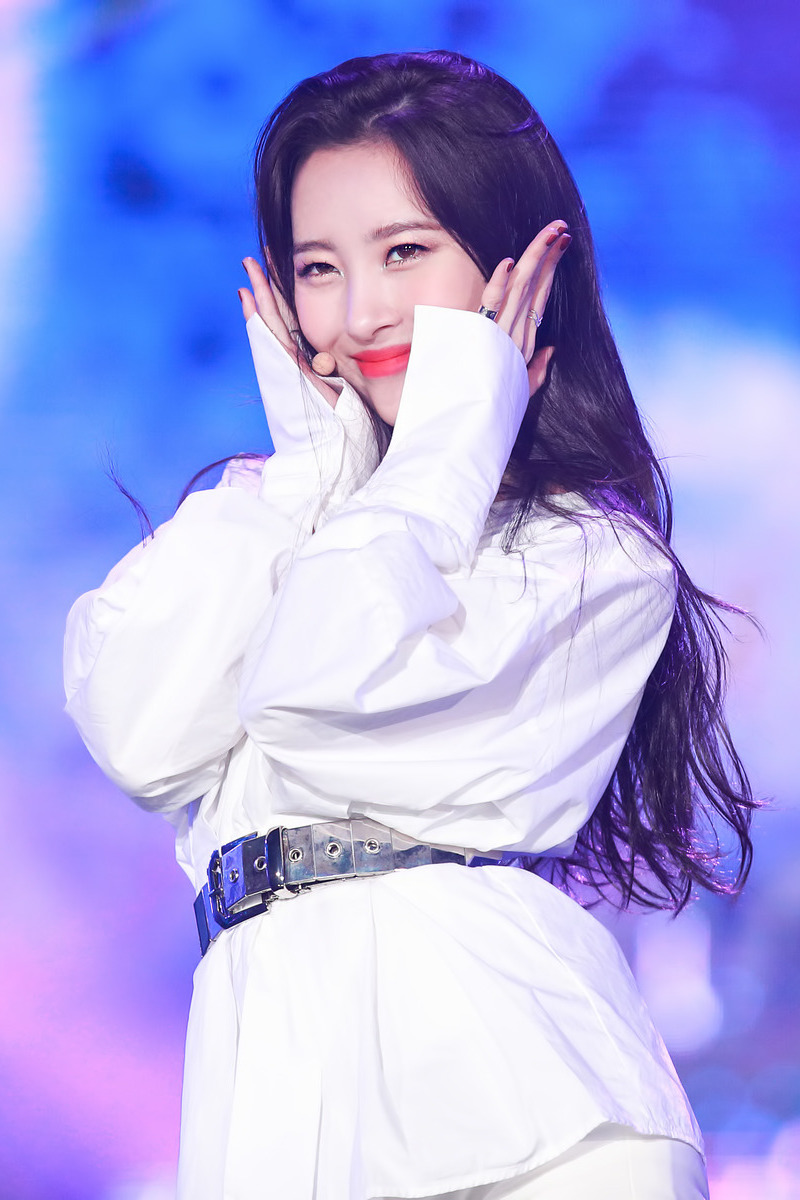
Seohyun (top) and Sunmi (bottom) each received their first M Countdown trophy as soloists for "Don't Say No" on episode 508 and "Gashina" on episode 540 respectively.
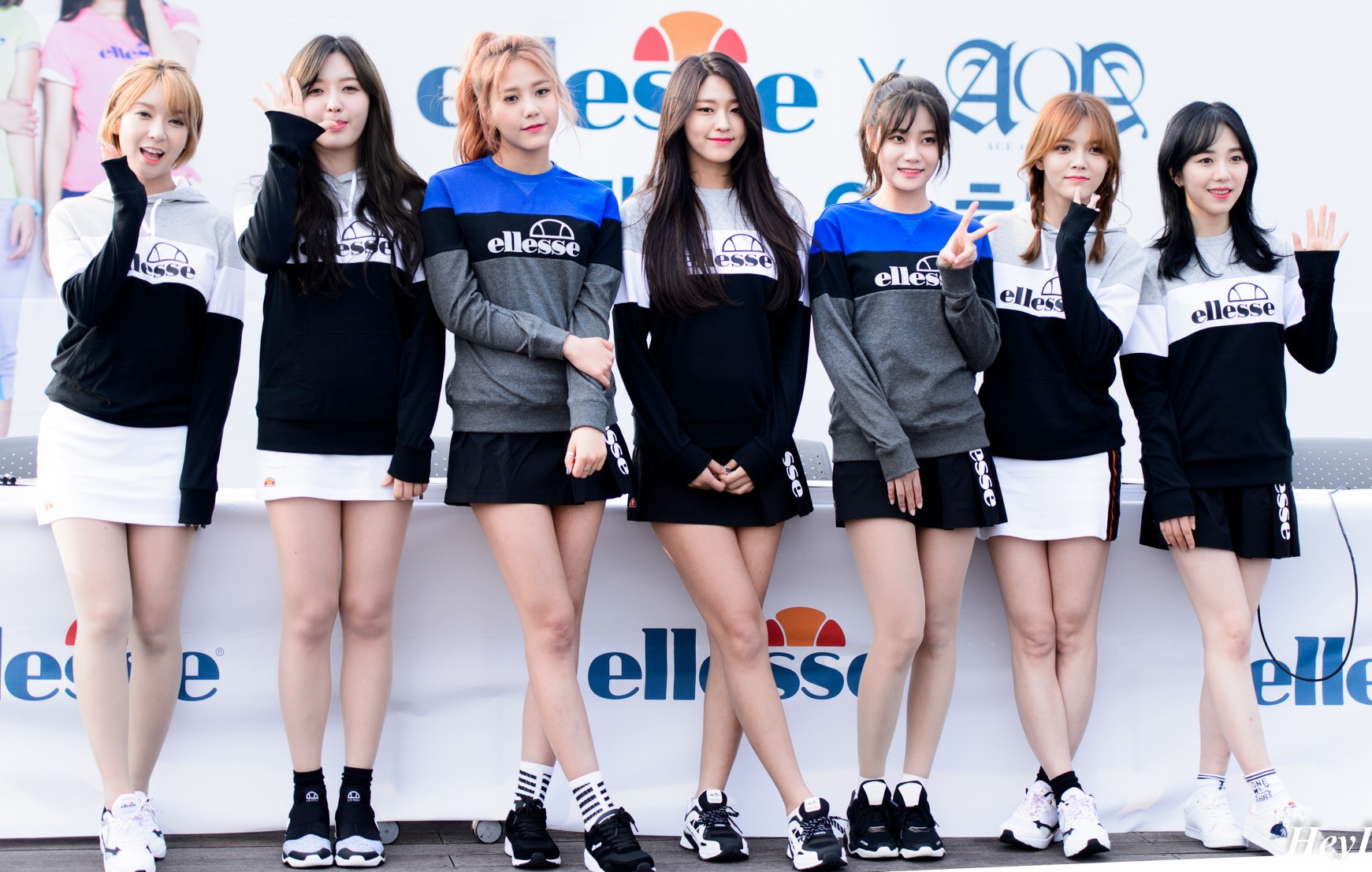
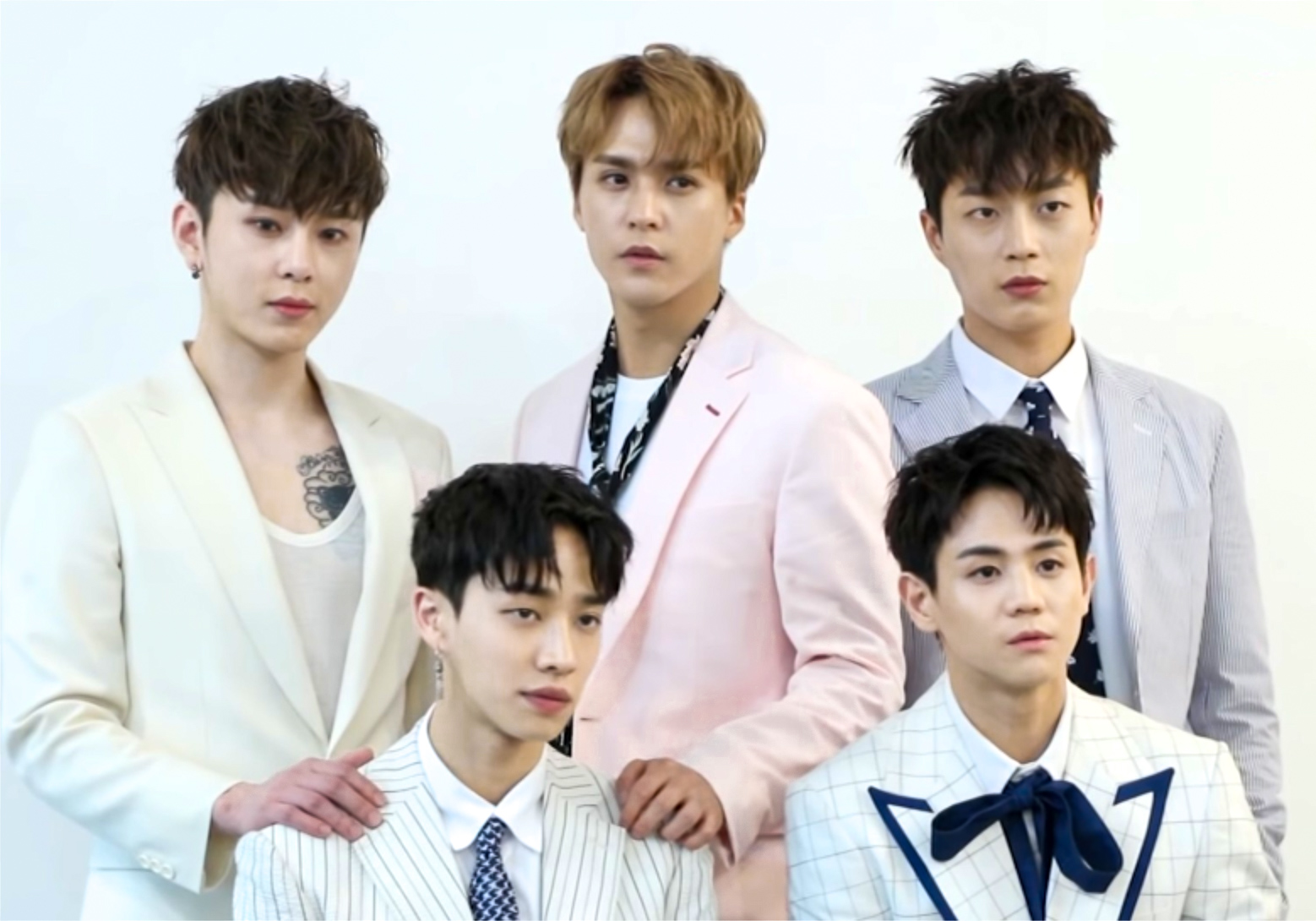
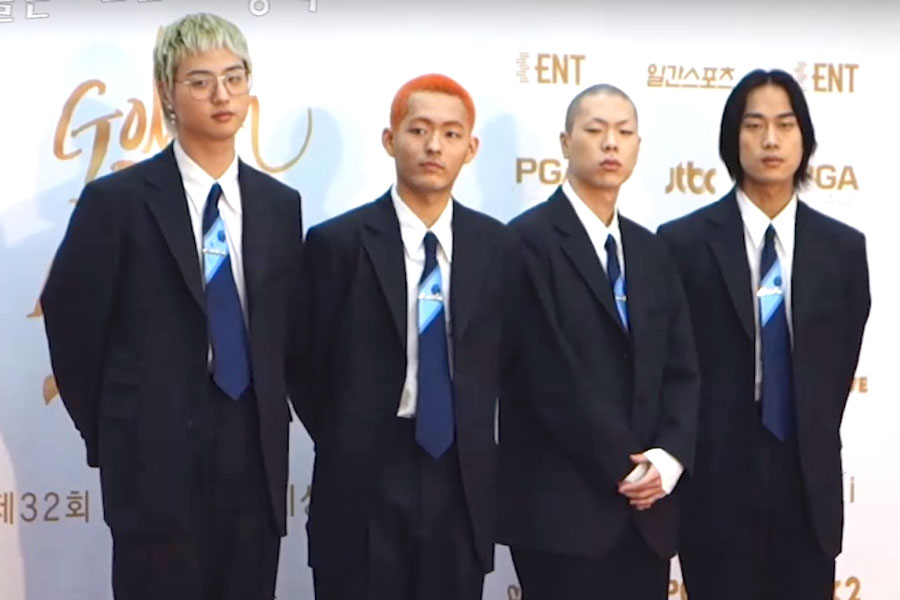
AOA (top), Highlight (center), and Hyukoh (bottom) won their first M Countdown trophies in 2017.

Key
	Triple Crown
	Highest score in 2017
—	No show was held

Episode	Date	Artist	Song	Points	Ref.
505	January 5	Big Bang	"Fxxk It"	9,750	
506	January 12	Big Bang	"Fxxk It"	10,225	
507	January 19	AKMU	"Last Goodbye"	6,432	
508	January 26	Seohyun	"Don't Say No"	7,411	
509	February 2	AOA	"Excuse Me"	—N/a	
510	February 9	Red Velvet	"Rookie"	10,503	
511	February 16	Red Velvet	"Rookie"	10,903	
512	February 23	BTS	"Spring Day"	10,629	
513	March 2	Twice	"Knock Knock"	9,942	
514	March 9	Taeyeon	"Fine"	9,747	
515	March 16	Twice	"Knock Knock"	9,440	
516	March 23	Got7	"Never Ever"	7,976	
517	March 30	Highlight	"Plz Don't Be Sad"	—N/a	
518	April 6	Highlight	"Plz Don't Be Sad"	8,821	
519	April 13	Winner	"Really Really"	9,216	
520	April 20	Winner	"Really Really"	8,903	
521	April 27	IU	"Palette"	7,626	
522	May 4	IU	"Palette"	—N/a	
523	May 11	Hyukoh	"Tomboy"	7,121	
524	May 18	Psy	"I Luv It"	7,843	
525	May 25	Twice	"Signal"	—N/a	
526	June 1	Twice	"Signal"	8,867	
527	June 8	Highlight	"Calling You"	9,182	
528	June 15	Seventeen	"Don't Wanna Cry"	8,990	
529	June 22	NCT 127	"Cherry Bomb"	7,325	
530	June 29	Mamamoo	"Yes I Am"	—N/a	
531	July 6	Mamamoo	"Yes I Am"	—N/a	
532	July 13	Mamamoo	"Yes I Am"	8,163	
533	July 20	Red Velvet	"Red Flavor"	10,877	
534	July 27	Exo	"Ko Ko Bop"	8,982	
535	August 3	Exo	"Ko Ko Bop"	9,003	
536	August 10	Exo	"Ko Ko Bop"	9,353	
537	August 17	Wanna One	"Energetic"	10,666	
538	August 24	Wanna One	"Energetic"	10,844	
539	August 31	Wanna One	"Energetic"	—N/a	
540	September 7	Sunmi	"Gashina"	8,486	
541	September 14	Exo	"Power"	11,000	
542	September 21	GFriend	"Summer Rain"	10,091	
543	September 28	BTS	"DNA"	11,000	
544	October 5	BTS	"DNA"	—N/a	
—	October 12	Special Broadcast of BTS Countdown			
545	October 19	NU'EST W	"Where You At"	9,521	
546	October 26	BtoB	"Missing You"	10,330	
547	November 2	BtoB	"Missing You"	9,968	
548	November 9	Twice	"Likey"	10,082	
549	November 16	Twice	"Likey"	—N/a	
550	November 23	Wanna One	"Beautiful"	—N/a	
—	November 30	MAMA Special Broadcast, winners were not announced			
—	December 7	MAMA Special Broadcast, winners were not announced			
—	December 14	MAMA Special Broadcast, winners were not announced			
551	December 21	Twice	"Heart Shaker"	9,776	
552	December 28	Twice	"Heart Shaker"	—N/a	
