= Chelcee Grimes =

English singer, songwriter, television presenter, footballer

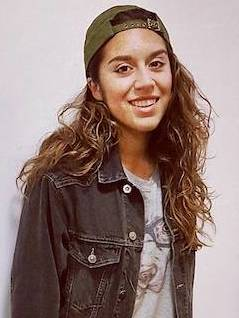
- Grimes in October 2016

Background information
- Born: Chelcee Maria Grimes; 8 May 1992 (age 34); Aigburth, Merseyside, England
- Genres: Pop
- Occupations: Singer; songwriter; television presenter; footballer
- Label: RCA
- Website: chelceegrimes.com

Chelcee Maria Grimes (born 8 May 1992) is an English singer, songwriter, television presenter, and footballer. She has written songs for Kylie Minogue, Dua Lipa, Blackpink, Kesha, Olly Murs, Jonas Blue, Louisa, the Saturdays, and Tom Walker. Grimes also hosted several football television shows and was a commentator for the semi-finals of the Eurovision Song Contest 2021.

== Early life ==
Chelcee Maria Grimes was born in Aigburth, Liverpool to Maria, her mother, and a father who died from a heart attack when she was a child. Grimes was raised by her mother and stepfather David, and moved to Wavertree to attend St Julie's Catholic High School, where she balanced playing football and performing music. After initially playing for Liverpool Ladies during her childhood, she decided to pursue a music career at the age of 16. During the same time period her sister was born.

== Music career ==
Grimes signed a four-album deal with RCA Records at the age of 18, but was dropped a year later. Her first songwriting breakthrough was "Million Miles", which she co-wrote with Danish producer Cutfather for Australian singer Kylie Minogue's twelfth studio album Kiss Me Once (2014). She wrote the hook after Cutfather played the track for her. In 2014, Grimes won the award for "Best Up and Coming New Act" at the Juice FM Style Awards. She has written songs for Kesha, the Saturdays, Dua Lipa, Little Mix, Blackpink, Olly Murs, Jonas Blue, Louisa, and Tom Walker. Grimes wrote "11:11" about her biological father in 2016, which is performed by South Korean singer Taeyeon. The ballad is sung in Korean and received 74 million views on YouTube by March 2025. In 2018, Grimes released her first two songs, "Just Like That" and "I Need a Night Out", and collaborated with Jonas Blue on "Wild" from the latter's debut studio album Blue (2018). She co-wrote several songs for Dua Lipa since the latter signed her first recording contract, including "Kiss and Make Up" (2018) and "Love Again" (2021).

=== Artistry and influences ===
Grimes has described herself as a pop singer. She grew up listening to Jennifer Lopez, Beyoncé, Kanye West, Pink, Gwen Stefani, Eminem, Lady Gaga, Christina Aguilera, and Avril Lavigne. Grimes developed her songwriting skills through listening to Lady Gaga's debut studio album The Fame (2008).

== Football career ==
Grimes' football career began when she began playing for Liverpool Ladies at the age of 10. After a brief hiatus to pursue a music career, she decided to return to football. As of September 2021, Grimes has played for Everton, Tottenham Hotspur, Tranmere Rovers, Fulham, and Merseyrail, Poulton Vics Ladies.

== Broadcasting career ==
Grimes is a presenter for the BBC and COPA90, where she covered the 2019 FIFA Women's World Cup for the former. Since September 2019, Grimes is the co-presenter of Match of the Day spin-off show MOTDx, and hosted her own show on BBC Sport titled Chelcee Away. She commentated during the semi-final of Eurovision Song Contest 2021 for the United Kingdom. In July 2021, Grimes presented several mini-series for BT Sport including Para Football Adventures, and Watch Us Rise. Throughout 2022, she participated in several reality competition series such as Freeze the Fear with Wim Hof, and The Games.

== Personal life ==
Grimes previously identified herself as bisexual in a 2019 interview with Gay Times, but considered herself to be a lesbian in 2021. She is the co-host of the BBC Sounds podcast Building Queertopia alongside Courtney Act, which is about the lifestyle of LGBT celebrities. Grimes also hosts her personal podcast entitled What We Coulda Been.

== Discography ==
=== Singles ===
==== As lead artist ====
List of singles, showing year released
Title	Year	Ref.
"Just Like That"	2018	
"I Need a Night Out"	2018	
"Girls"	2019	
"Time to Talk"	2019	
"Tryna Not Fall in Love"	2019	
"Mother"	2022	

==== As featured artist ====
List of singles as featured artist, with other performing artists, showing year released and album name
Title	Year	Album	Ref.
"Wild" Jonas Blue featuring Chelcee Grimes, TINI and Jhay Cortez	2018	Blue	

=== Songwriting credits ===
List of songwriting credits, with other performing artists, showing year released and album name
Title	Year	Artist	Album	Ref.
"Million Miles"	2014	Kylie Minogue	Kiss Me Once	
"Walking Through the Desert"	2014	The Saturdays	Finest Selection: The Greatest Hits	
"First Time"	2014	BoA	Who's Back?	
"Tuxedo"	2014	Mic Lowry	Non-album single	
"Playground"	2014	Alexa Curtis	Non-album single	
"Not Over You"	2015	Doda	Non-album single	
"Note to Self"	2015	HomeTown	HomeTown	
"You Are the One"	2015	Doda	Non-album single	
"Down With Ya"	2015	Sweet California	Head for the Stars	
"Dizzy"	2016	Saszan	Non-album single	
"Romantic"	2016	Stanaj	From a Distance	
"Where Do We Go From Here"	2016	Malte Castro	Where Do We Go From Here	
"All the Time"	2016	Chris Lane	Girl Problems	
"Nothing Like Him"	2016	Mic Lowry	Non-album single	
"Broke"	2016	Sweet California	Non-album single	
"So Good"	2016	Louisa Johnson	Non-album single	
"11:11"	2016	Taeyeon	My Voice	
"Deeper"	2016	Olly Murs	24 Hrs	
"Warrior"	2016	Amelia Lily	Unreleased	
"Dreams"	2017	Dua Lipa	Dua Lipa	
"Bad Together"	2017	Dua Lipa	Dua Lipa	
"Shame on You"	2018	Claire Richards	My Wildest Dreams	
"Kiss and Make Up"	2018	Dua Lipa and Blackpink	Dua Lipa	
"Love Again"	2020	Dua Lipa	Future Nostalgia	
"Wonderland"	2020	Roxen and Alexander Rybak	Non-album single	
"When I'm With You"	2026	Malou Lovis	Non-album single	
