= My Voice (album) =

- Digital and Fine version cover

Studio album by Taeyeon
- Released: February 28, 2017
- Recorded: 2016–2017
- Genres: Pop; pop rock; R&B; PBR&B
- Length: 41:15
- Language: Korean
- Label: SM
- Producer: Lee Soo-man

Taeyeon chronology
Why (2016)	My Voice (2017)	This Christmas: Winter Is Coming (2017)

Singles from My Voice
- 1. "11:11" Released: November 1, 2016; 2. "Fine" Released: February 28, 2017; 3. "Make Me Love You" Released: April 5, 2017

My Voice is the debut studio album by South Korean singer Taeyeon. It was released on February 28, 2017, by SM Entertainment and distributed by KT Music. There are two physical editions of the album with similar tracklist but separate covers and booklets. Musically, songs on My Voice are based on Taeyeon's vocals and incorporate various genres including pop, pop rock, and PBR&B. Prior to the release of the album, a music video for "I Got Love" was released on February 18, 2017, as a promotional tool.

The title track and lead single "Fine" was released simultaneously with the album on February 28. To promote My Voice, Taeyeon performed "Fine" on three music programs–Music Bank, Show! Music Core, and Inkigayo from March 3 to 5. The album earned critical and commercial success, peaking atop South Korea's Gaon Album Chart with first-week sales of 109,275 physical copies. On April 5, 2017, a Deluxe edition of My Voice was released. Apart from the original tracks, this edition adds Taeyeon's past hit single "11:11", and three new songs including the single "Make Me Love You".

== Background and release ==
Since debuting as a soloist in October 2015 with the successful extended plays I and Why as well as chart-topping digital singles "Rain" and "11:11", South Korean singer Kim Tae-yeon (known by her mononym Taeyeon) has risen to prominence and established herself as the country's most popular individual celebrity of 2016. On February 14, 2017, Taeyeon's agency SM Entertainment announced that her first full-length studio album would be released in the end of February. A day later, the agency released promotional photos and a short trailer of the music video for a new song titled "I Got Love", which was set to be the album's pre-released track. On February 20, 2017, the album's title was revealed to be My Voice, with the title track being "Fine".

The digital edition of My Voice contains 12 songs, while the physical release includes 13 tracks with a bonus titled "Time Spent Walking Through Memories" (기억을 걷는 시간), which is a cover of South Korean indie rock band Nell. There are two versions of the physical edition–"Fine" and "I Got Love" versions with different covers and booklets.

== Composition ==
The album incorporates various genres that are "based on Taeyeon's unique vocals", including pop, R&B, and PBR&B. Tamar Herman from Billboard detailed the album as an emphasis on pop rock and R&B. The title track "Fine" was revealed to be an alternative pop song. Meanwhile, "Sweet Love" is a pop and R&B song and "I'm OK" draws influences from jazz. "Cover Up" is a tropical house number instrumented by musical keyboard and string instruments, while "Love in Color" is an acoustic piano ballad that highlights Taeyeon's vocals. Three new original songs featured on the deluxe edition are "Make Me Love You", "I Blame on You" and "Curtain Call". "Make Me Love You" is a soulful pop and R&B song, while "I Blame on You" is a pop ballad, and "Curtain Call" is a pop rock number.

== Reception ==
Professional ratings
Review scores
Source	Rating
IZM	3/5 stars
The Star	8/10

Upon reviewing My Voice for South Korean music portal IZM, Hyun Min-young was impressed towards the album's "Westernized" and experimental musical styles including tropical house, R&B, and swing. He additionally lauded Taeyeon's "impressive" vocals on the album, which was exemplified by the refrain of the track "Sweet Love". However, he did not favor the album's songwriting, commenting that "the music by overseas producers [...] are not compatible with the lyrics of the songs, [...] causing disproportion between the melody and the lyrics". The Star's Chester Chin also praised Taeyeon's "impressive" vocal performance, deeming it as "the star of the show". While considering the album's musical styles as a lack of "cohesiveness" due to its incorporation of multiple genres, Chin argued that My Voice was a "monumental record" as it focused more on Taeyeon's artistry rather than K-pop's common emphasis on "slick boot-camp choreography, powerful visuals and a highly manufactured sound".

My Voice was an instant commercial success in South Korea; prior to its release, the album's pre-order sales exceeded 114,000 physical copies, which set a record for a female soloist in terms of highest pre-order album sales. It debuted atop the Gaon Album Chart and was the third best-selling album of February 2017 in South Korea with sales of 109,275 copies. As of April 2017, it has sold over 142,894 units in South Korea. In Japan, the album debuted at number thirty-nine on the Oricon Albums Chart and has sold over 5,000 copies as of April 2017. My Voice debuted at number two the Billboard World Albums, becoming Taeyeon's second number-two entry on the chart following Why (2016). It additionally charted at number 19 on the Top Heatseekers. In conjunction with the commercial performance of the album in the United States, Taeyeon was subject to increasing interest on social platforms, appearing at number 31 of the Social 50 chart for the week of March 8, 2017.

On June 27, Fuse released its list of “The 20 Best Albums of 2017 So Far,” and Taeyeon's “My Voice” came in No. 17. It is the only Korean release to make the list. Later, Billboard listed the album at number 15 in "20 Best K-Pop Albums 2017", praising the album's reflective, nostalgia-tinged pop album that explores the singer's titular voice through a variety of genres. Plus, they wrote "My Voice is playful at times and evocative at others as it flits through musical styles, but throughout the listening experience, it is Taeyeon’s crisp vocals that are front and center."

=== Accolades ===
Billboard ranked My Voice at number 15 on their list of the 20 Best K-pop Albums of 2017: Critics' Picks.

Awards and nominations for My Voice
Year	Award	Category	Result	Ref.
2018	Golden Disc Awards	Album Bonsang	Won	
2018	Golden Disc Awards	Album Daesang	Nominated	
2018	Gaon Chart Music Awards	Album of the Year – 1st Quarter	Nominated	
2018	Korean Music Awards	Best Pop Album	Nominated	

== Promotion ==
Prior to the release of the album, a series of "highlight videos" featuring snippets of the album's tracks were released by SM Entertainment through several channels including Naver and YouTube. Promotion schedule for the album started on March 3, 2017, with a performance on Music Bank, followed by performances on Show! Music Core and Inkigayo. On March 29, 2017, it was announced that a deluxe edition of the album would be released on April 5, 2017. The tracklist incorporates three newly recorded songs and Taeyeon's previous digital single "11:11". The title track and lead single off the deluxe edition was titled "Make Me Love You". To further promote the album, Taeyeon embarked on a concert tour titled "Persona", kicking off on May 12, 2017, at the Seoul Olympic Park. The tour subsequently visited Hong Kong, Taipei and Bangkok.

== Track listing ==
My Voice – Digital standard edition
No.	Title	Lyrics	Music	Arrangement	Length
1.	"Fine"	Jinli (Full8loom)	Michael Woods (Rice n' Peas); Kevin White (Rice n' Peas); Andrew Bazzi (Rice n' Peas); Shaylen Carroll; MZMC	Rice n' Peas	3:29
2.	"Cover Up"	Realmeee	Grades; Caroline Ailin; Realmeee	Grades; Caroline Ailin; Realmeee	3:26
3.	"Feel So Fine" (날개; Nalgae; lit. 'Wings')	Moon Hye-min	Courtney Jenaé Stahl; Daniel Durn Jørgensen (Cynosure Music); Katrine Neya Klith Jørgensen (Cynosure Music); Johan Gustafsson (Trinity Music); Sebastian Lundberg (Trinity Music); Fredrik Häggstam (Trinity Music)	Courtney Jenaé Stahl; Cynosure Music; Trinity Music	3:39
4.	"I Got Love"	Kenzie	Kenzie; Thomas Troelsen; Eyelar	Thomas Troelsen; Eyelar	3:10
5.	"I'm Ok"	Yorkie (Devine Channel); Ryu Woo	Im Kwang-wook (Devine Channel); Tyler Sharny; Diana Salvatore; Fabio BOI Angelini	Fabio BOI Angelini	3:34
6.	"Time Lapse"	Kim Jong-wan	Kim Jong-wan; Zooey	Kim Jong-wan; Zooey	4:14
7.	"Sweet Love"	Kenzie	Kenzie; The Stereotypes; Racquelle "Rahky" Anteola	The Stereotypes	3:04
8.	"When I Was Young"	Lee Joo-hyoung (MonoTree)	Lee Joo-hyoung (MonoTree)	Lee Joo-hyoung (MonoTree)	3:52
9.	"Lonely Night"	Kenzie	Kenzie	Kenzie	3:43
10.	"Love in Color" (수채화; Suchaehwa; lit. 'Watercolor')	Lee Yoon-seol	Myah Marie Langston; Krysta Youngs	Myah Marie Langston; Krysta Youngs	2:57
11.	"Fire"	JQ (Makeumine Works); Jo Mi-yang (Makeumine Works)	Myah Marie Langston; Bennett Armstrong; Justyn Armstrong; Daren Rauer; Carah Faye	My Crazy Girlfriend; Carah Faye	3:07
12.	"Eraser"	Mafly (Joombas); Lee Seu-ran	Dillon Pace; Sean Douglas; Felicia Barton	Dillon Pace	2:54
Total length:					41:15

My Voice – Physical standard edition (bonus track)
No.	Title	Lyrics	Music	Arrangement	Length
13.	"Time Spent Walking Through Memories" (기억을 걷는 시간; Gieog-eul Geonneun Sigan)	Kim Jong-wan	Kim Jong-wan	Hong So-jin	3:53
Total length:					45:19

My Voice – Deluxe edition
No.	Title	Lyrics	Music	Arrangement	Length
1.	"Make Me Love You"	Jo Yoon-kyung	Aaron Benward; Matthew Tishler; Felicia Barton	Aaron Benward; Matthew Tishler; Felicia Barton	3:33
2.	"Fine"	Jinli (Full8loom)	Michael Woods (Rice n' Peas); Kevin White (Rice n' Peas); Andrew Bazzi (Rice n' Peas); Shaylen Carroll; MZMC	Rice n' Peas	3:29
3.	"Cover Up"	Realmeee	Grades; Caroline Ailin; Realmeee	Grades; Caroline Ailin; Realmeee	3:26
4.	"Feel So Fine" (날개; Nalgae; lit. 'Wings')	Moon Hye-min	Courtney Jenaé Stahl; Daniel Durn Jørgensen (Cynosure Music); Katrine Neya Klith Jørgensen (Cynosure Music); Johan Gustafsson (Trinity Music); Sebastian Lundberg (Trinity Music); Fredrik Häggstam (Trinity Music)	Courtney Jenaé Stahl; Cynosure Music; Trinity Music	3:39
5.	"I Got Love"	Kenzie	Kenzie; Thomas Troelsen; Eyelar	Thomas Troelsen; Eyelar	3:10
6.	"I'm Ok"	Yorkie (Devine Channel); Ryu Woo	Im Kwang-wook (Devine Channel); Tyler Sharny; Diana Salvatore; Fabio BOI Angelini	Fabio BOI Angelini	3:34
7.	"Time Lapse"	Kim Jong-wan	Kim Jong-wan; Zooey	Kim Jong-wan; Zooey	4:14
8.	"Sweet Love"	Kenzie	Kenzie; The Stereotypes; Racquelle "Rahky" Anteola	The Stereotypes	3:04
9.	"When I Was Young"	Lee Joo-hyoung (MonoTree)	Lee Joo-hyoung (MonoTree)	Lee Joo-hyoung (MonoTree)	3:52
10.	"I Blame on You"	Yorkie (Devine Channel)	Im Kwang-wook (Devine Channel); Lena Leon (Rolen Group); Aurora Pfeiffer (Rolen Group); Ryan Henderson; Richard Beynon	Ryan Henderson; Richard Beynon	3:23
11.	"Lonely Night"	Kenzie	Kenzie	Kenzie	3:43
12.	"11:11"	Kim Eana	Christian Vinten; Chelcee Grimes	Christian Vinten; Chelcee Grimes	3:43
13.	"Love in Color" (수채화; Suchaehwa; lit. 'Watercolor')	Lee Yoon-seol	Myah Marie Langston; Krysta Youngs	Myah Marie Langston; Krysta Youngs	2:57
14.	"Fire"	JQ (Makeumine Works); Jo Mi-yang (Makeumine Works)	Myah Marie Langston; Bennett Armstrong; Justyn Armstrong; Daren Rauer; Carah Faye	My Crazy Girlfriend; Carah Faye	3:07
15.	"Eraser"	Mafly (Joombas); Lee Seu-ran	Dillon Pace; Sean Douglas; Felicia Barton	Dillon Pace	2:54
16.	"Curtain Call"	Jang Yoon-ji	Peter Wallevik (PhD); Daniel Davidsen (PhD); Tebey Ottoh; Noel Salmon	PhD; Tebey Ottoh; Noel Salmon	3:52
17.	"Time Spent Walking Through Memories" (CD bonus track) (기억을 걷는 시간; Gieogeul Geonneun Sigan)	Kim Jong-wan	Kim Jong-wan	Hong So-jin	3:53
Total length:					59:50

== Personnel ==
Credits are adapted from the liner notes of My Voice.

- S.M. Entertainment Co., Ltd. – executive producer
- Lee Soo-man – producer
- Taeyeon – vocals

== Charts ==
=== Weekly charts ===
Chart (2017)	Peak position
South Korean Albums (Gaon)	1
Japanese Albums (Oricon)	39
US Heatseekers Albums (Billboard)	19
US World Albums (Billboard)	2

=== Monthly charts ===
Chart (2017)	Peak position
South Korean Albums (Gaon)	3
South Korean Albums (Gaon)	1 (Deluxe)

=== Year-end chart ===
Chart (2017)	Peak position
South Korean Albums (Gaon)	22
South Korean Albums (Gaon)	45 (Deluxe)

== Sales ==
Country	Sales amount
Japan	8,800
South Korea	151,329
South Korea (deluxe)	105,518

== Release history ==
Region	Date	Format	Edition	Label	Ref.
South Korea	February 28, 2017	CD; digital download	Standard	SM Entertainment	
Various	February 28, 2017	Digital download	Standard	SM Entertainment	
South Korea	April 5, 2017	CD; digital download	Deluxe	SM Entertainment	
Various	April 5, 2017	Digital download	Deluxe	SM Entertainment	
Taiwan	May 9, 2017	CD	Deluxe	Universal Music Taiwan	

== See also ==
- List of Gaon Album Chart number ones of 2017
