= Felicia Barton =

American singer and songwriter (born 1982)

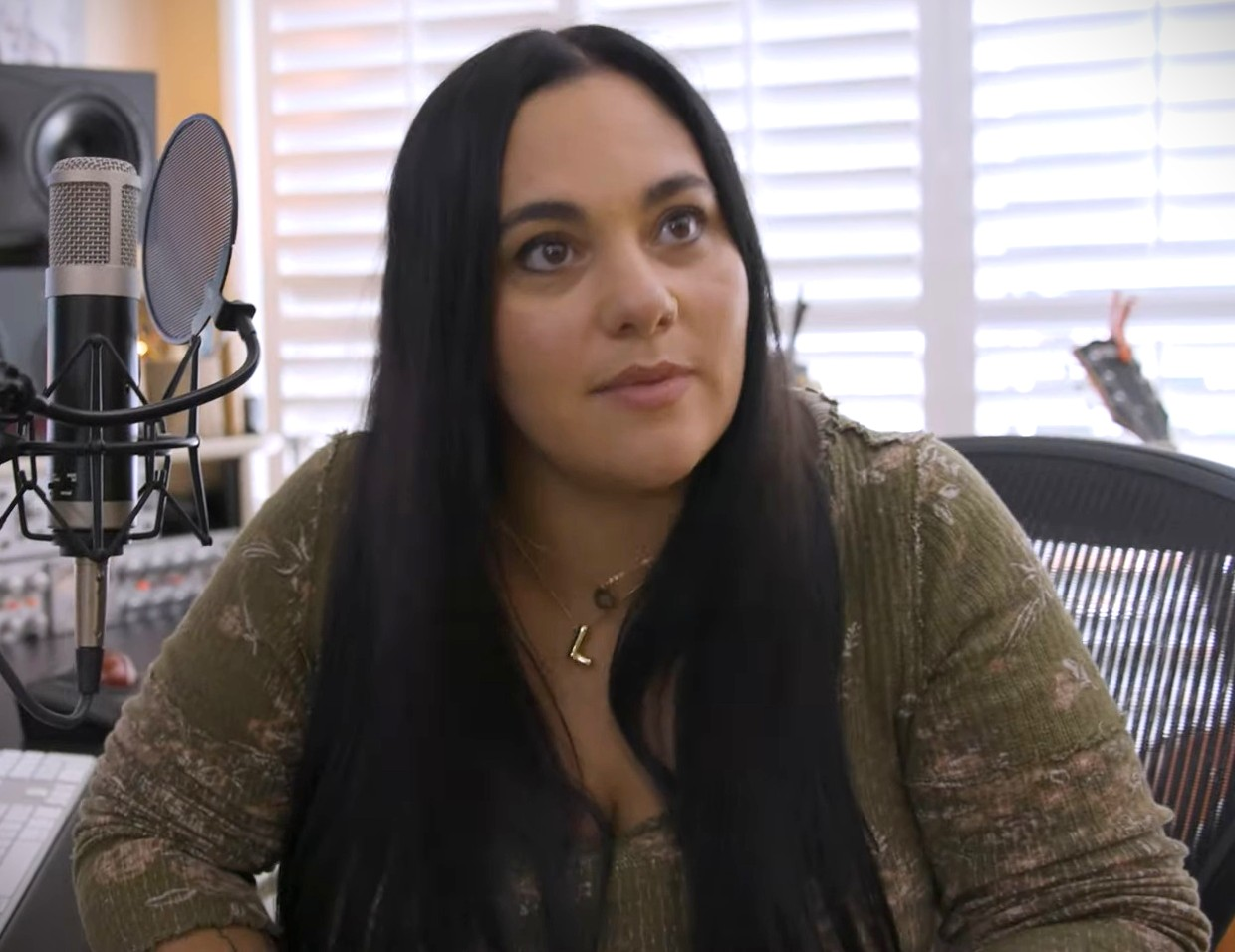
- Barton in 2025

Background information
- Born: Felicia Diana Hocker; March 6, 1982 (age 44); Xenia, Ohio, U.S.
- Genres: Pop, R&B, soul, rock
- Occupations: Singer, songwriter
- Instrument: Vocals
- Years active: 2008–present
- Spouse: Loren Barton (m. 2001)
- Children: Malachi Barton

Felicia Diana Barton (née Hocker; born March 6, 1982) is an American singer and songwriter, best known for her appearance on the eighth season of American Idol in 2009. Since 2013, she has joined Warner-Chappell Music and Pulse Recording as a songwriter, and has co-written songs for Demi Lovato, Seohyun, Jena Irene Asciutto, and Lea Michele.

Since its 2018 revival on ABC, Barton has been employed as one of the background vocalists on American Idol. She has been singing with the band for the past seven seasons, including 2020's virtual season throughout the COVID-19 pandemic.

== Early life ==
Barton was born Felicia Diana Hocker on March 6, 1982, in Xenia, Ohio, to Rick and Diana (née Davis) Hocker. She has a brother named Preston. She was raised in Virginia Beach, Virginia after the family relocated there in 1986, attending Alanton Elementary School and Cox High School. In 2000, Barton won the pageant title of Miss Virginia Beach.

Her parents are in church leadership at Virginia Beach's Freedom Fellowship Church.

== Career ==
=== American Idol ===
Barton auditioned for the eighth season of American Idol in Louisville, Kentucky. In the final round of Hollywood, Barton was eliminated by the judges. However, the day after the episode containing her elimination, it was announced that semi-finalist Joanna Pacitti had been disqualified, and that Barton would be reprieved, replacing her in the Top 36. Barton performed in the third semi-finalist group, and received positive response for her performance from both the judges and commentators on the Internet. The next night, it was announced that she did not advance to the finals.

==== Performances/Results ====
Week	Theme	Song choice	Original artist	Order #	Result
Audition	Auditioner's Choice	"Put Your Records On"	Corinne Bailey Rae	N/A	Advanced
Hollywood Rounds, Part 1	First Solo	Not aired	Not aired	N/A	Advanced
Hollywood Rounds, Part 2	Group Performance	Not aired	Not aired	N/A	Advanced
Hollywood Rounds, Part 3	Second Solo	Not aired	Not aired	N/A	Eliminated; later reprieved
Top 36/Semi-final 3	Billboard Hot 100 Hits to Date	"No One"	Alicia Keys	8	Eliminated

=== Post-Idol Career ===
==== Lost Words (2011) ====
Barton released her debut EP, Lost Words, on September 1, 2011. It features seven pop, rock, and soul based songs.

==== Other ventures ====
In early 2013, Barton signed a "joint-venture publishing deal with Warner-Chappell & Pulse". She has co-written songs for Demi Lovato, Lea Michele, and American Idol finalist Jena Irene. Barton has worked as a background singer on Dancing with the Stars. In July 2015, it was announced that she would perform at the Miss USA 2015 pageant.

Barton became one of the background vocalists on ABC's revival of American Idol. Since the sixteenth season began airing in 2018, she has joined music director Kris Pooley and the band on stage to support the contestants during performances. She is also the lead singer for the theme song of the 2017 reboot of the Disney animated series DuckTales.

== Personal life ==
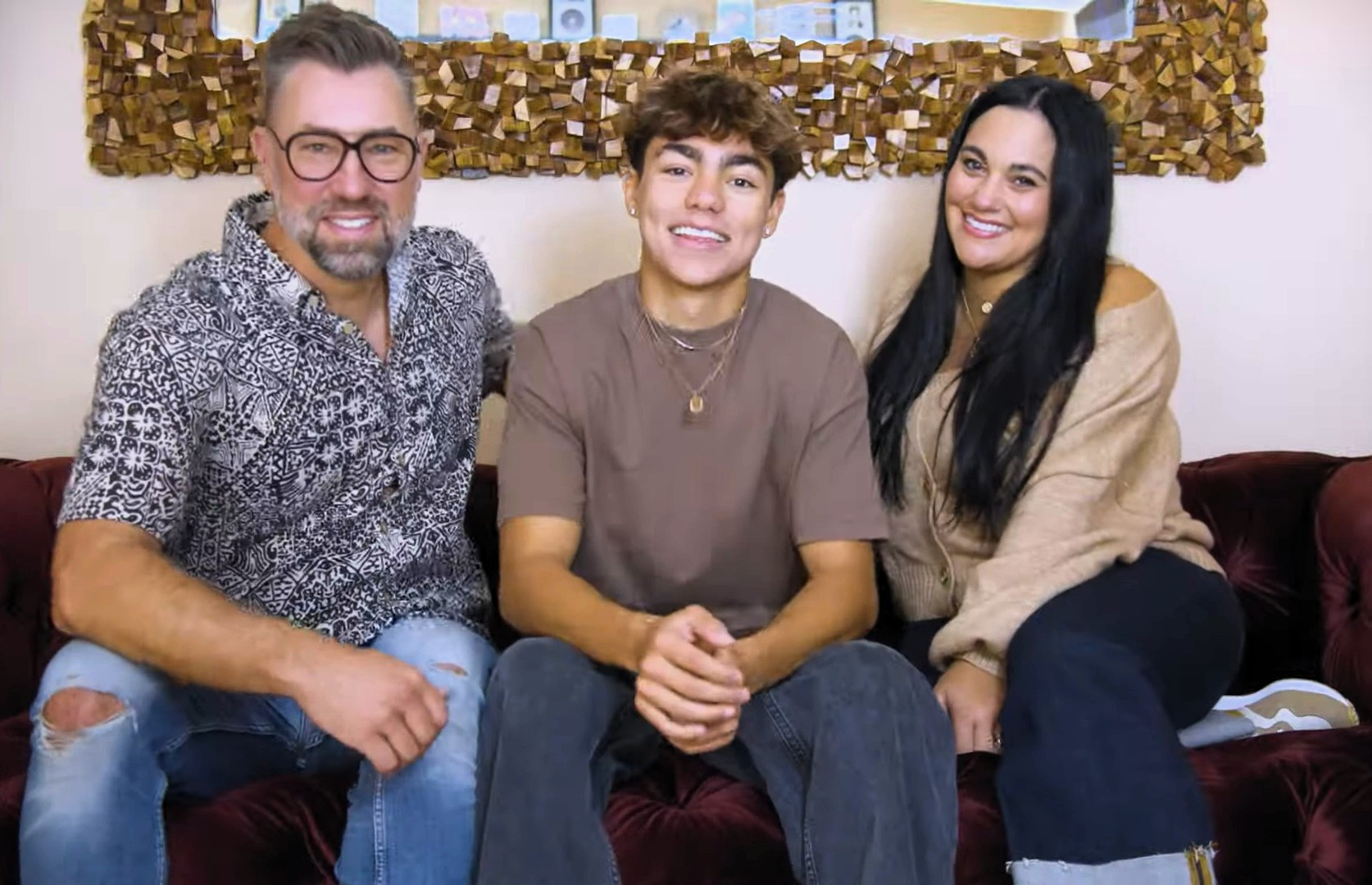
Left to right: Loren, Malachi, Felicia Barton in 2025

Barton married her husband Loren Barton in May 2001. Together, they have one son, Malachi Barton.

== Select songwriting discography ==
Year	Artist	Album	Song	Co-written with
2017	Kim Tae-yeon (SNSD)	My Voice	"Eraser"	Dillon Pace, Sean Douglas
2017	Seohyun	Don't Say No	"Don't Say No"	Kenzie, Matthew Tishler
2017	Seohyun	Don't Say No	"Hello" (ft. Eric Nam)	Andrew Underberg, Andrew Choi
2014	Jena Irene	N/A	"We Are One"	Anne Preven, Mitch Allan
2014	Lea Michele	Louder	"Cue The Rain"	Lea Michele, Matt Rad, Preven
2014	Lea Michele	Louder	"Don't Let Go"	Rad, Preven
2014	Lea Michele	Louder	"Gone Tonight"	Michele, Preven, CJ Baran, Drew Lawrence
2013	Demi Lovato	Demi	"Nightingale"	Demi Lovato, Rad, Preven

== Discography ==
=== Albums ===
- Lost Words – EP (2011)
Track Listing

No.	Title	Length
1.	"I Need Sky"	3:07
2.	"Lost Words"	4:07
3.	"Catching Shadows"	3:55
4.	"Emergency"	3:27
5.	"Get Out"	3:43
6.	"You Know"	3:06
7.	"Love Has A Name"	4:06

=== Other songs ===
- I'm Your Girl (2015) for the Descendants soundtrack.
- "In the House" (2019), performed with Scott Krippayne for 101 Dalmatian Street album
