= Fine (Taeyeon song) =

Single by Taeyeon

from the album My Voice
- Released: February 28, 2017
- Genre: Ballad; alternative pop
- Length: 3:29
- Label: S.M.
- Songwriters: Jin Ri; Michael Woods; Kevin White; Andrew Bazzi; Shaylen Carroll; MZMC
- Producer: Rice n' Peas

Taeyeon singles chronology
"11:11" (2016)	"Fine" (2017)	"Make Me Love You" (2017)

Music video
- "Fine" on YouTube

"Fine" is a song recorded by South Korean singer Taeyeon for her first studio album My Voice (2017). It was released on February 28, 2017, as the album's single by SM Entertainment. The song's lyrics were penned by Jin Ri, while its music was composed by Michael Woods, Kevin White, Andrew Bazzi, Shaylen Carroll, and MZMC. Musically, "Fine" is an alternative pop song that highlights Taeyeon's vocals.

The single received positive reviews from music critics, who praised Taeyeon's vocals on the song and compared its musical styles to those of American singer Taylor Swift. It debuted atop the Gaon Digital Chart and remained on the top position for a further week. The song additionally charted at number seven on the Billboard World Digital Songs. To promote "Fine" and My Voice, Taeyeon performed the song on three music programs: Music Bank, Show! Music Core, and Inkigayo. A music video for the song was also released; it depicts Taeyeon reminiscing about a past relationship.

== Background ==
"Fine"
"Fine" is an acoustic song that highlights Taeyeon's vocals.

Since debuting as a soloist in October 2015 with the successful extended plays I and Why as well as chart-topping digital singles "Rain" and "11:11", South Korean singer Kim Tae-yeon (known by her mononym Taeyeon) has risen to prominence and established herself as the country's most popular individual celebrity of 2016.

On February 14, 2017, Taeyeon's agency S.M. Entertainment announced that her first full-length studio album would be released in the end of February. The album's title was My Voice, while the title track and lead single was announced to be "Fine", which was released simultaneously with the release of the album.

== Promotion ==
A music video for the song was released in conjunction with the release of My Voice on February 28, 2017. Billboard's Tamar Herman described the visual as "artsy". Taeyeon performed the song for the first time on KBS' Music Bank on March 3, 2017. She subsequently performed the song on MBC's Show! Music Core and SBS' Inkigayo on the two following days.

== Reception ==
Hyun Min-young from IZM praised Taeyeon's vocals on the song and compared its musical styles to those of American singer Taylor Swift. Jeff Benjamin from Billboard labelled it "a 2.0 sonic version" of Taeyeon's 2015 single "I" while praised her "uplifting" vocals.

"Fine" debuted atop the Gaon Digital Chart for the week ending March 4, 2017. Within its first week of release, the single sold 251,751 digital units and gained 5,057,692 streams through South Korean digital music services. It remained on the top position for a further week, with 115,847 downloads and 5,533,647 streams gained during the week of March 5–11, 2017. "Fine" was the best-performing song on the Gaon Digital Chart of March, accumulating 437,057 downloads and 22,063,715 streams through South Korean music services.

The song additionally debuted at number seven on the Billboard World Digital Songs.

== Credits and personnel ==
Credits are adapted from the CD booklet of My Voice.

Studio

- SM Big Shot Studio – recording, digital editing
- SM Blue Ocean Studio – mixing
- Sterling Sound – mastering

Personnel

- SM Entertainment – executive producer
- Lee Soo-man – producer
- Taeyeon – vocals, background vocals
- Jin Ri – lyrics
- Michael Woods (Rice n' Peas) – producer, composition, arrangement
- Kevin White (Rice n' Peas) – producer, composition, arrangement
- Andrew Bazzi – composition
- Shaylen Carroll – composition
- MZMC – composition
- G-High – vocal directing, Pro Tools operating
- Choi Young-kyung – background vocals
- Lee Min-kyu – recording, digital editing
- Kim Cheol-sun – mixing
- Tom Coyne – mastering

== Charts ==
=== Weekly charts ===
Chart (2017)	Peak position
South Korea (Gaon)	1
South Korea (K-pop Hot 100)	45
US World Digital Songs (Billboard)	7

=== Monthly charts ===
Chart (2017)	Position
South Korea (Gaon)	1

=== Year-end charts ===
Chart (2017)	Position
South Korea (Gaon)	43

== Sales ==
Region	Sales
South Korea	2,500,000

== Awards and nominations ==
Year	Award	Category	Result
2017	9th Melon Music Awards	Best Ballad	Nominated
2018	32nd Golden Disc Awards	Digital Bonsang	Nominated
2018	7th Gaon Chart Music Awards	Song of the Year – February	Nominated

Music program awards
Program	Date
M Countdown (Mnet)	March 9, 2017
Music Bank (KBS)	March 10, 2017

== See also ==
- List of M Countdown Chart winners (2017)
- List of Music Bank Chart winners (2017)
