= 11:11 (Taeyeon song) =

Single by Taeyeon

from the album My Voice
- Released: November 1, 2016
- Genre: Pop ballad
- Length: 3:43
- Label: SM Entertainment
- Composers: Christian Vinten; Chelcee Grimes
- Lyricist: Kim Eana

Taeyeon singles chronology
"Why" (2016)	"11:11" (2016)	"Fine" (2017)

Audio sample
- file; help

"11:11" is a song recorded by South Korean singer Taeyeon. It was released as a digital single on November 1, 2016, by SM Entertainment. The song's lyrics were penned by Kim Eana while its music was composed by Christian Vinten and Chelcee Grimes. The song was later included in the Deluxe edition of Taeyeon's first studio album My Voice which was released on April 5, 2017.

== Background and release ==
On October 28, 2016, SM Entertainment announced that Taeyeon would be releasing a digital single titled "11:11" on November 1. On October 31, the music video teaser was released. The song was released alongside its music video on November 1. A live acoustic performance video was released on November 8.

== Composition ==
"11:11" was written by Kim Eana, and composed and arranged by Christian Vinten and Chelcee Grimes. It was described as an "emotional" pop ballad song characterized by "melody of an acoustic guitar" with lyrics likens "the time right before the day ends to the time right before a romantic relationship completely ends, recalling memories of making a wish together with a lover when the hour and minute hands point to '11:11'".

== Reception ==
"11:11" debuted at number two on South Korea's Gaon Digital Chart for the chart issue dated October 30 – November 5, 2016, and sold 238,197 downloads during its first week of release. It was the second best-performing single of November 2016 on the Gaon Digital Chart, ranking behind Twice's "TT". "11:11" charted at number 89 on the Gaon Year-end Digital Chart of 2016, and sold 668,462 downloads in South Korea in 2016. It additionally peaked at number 5 on the Billboard World Digital Songs chart, selling 3,000 downloads, becoming her best sales week on the chart.

Billboard ranked the song at number 7 on their top 20 K-pop songs of 2016. By the end of 2017, "11:11" sold over 1.4 million digital copies in South Korea.

== Track listing ==
Digital download
No.	Title	Lyrics	Music	Length
1.	"11:11"	Kim Eana	Christian Vinten; Chelcee Grimes	3:43
2.	"11:11" (Instrumental)		Christian Vinten; Chelcee Grimes	3:43

== Credits and personnel ==
Credits adapted from the liner notes of My Voice (Deluxe edition).

Studio

- SM Blue Ocean Studio – recording, mixing
- Doobdoob Studio – digital editing
- Sterling Sound – mastering

Personnel

- SM Entertainment – executive producer
- Lee Soo-man – producer
- Taeyeon – vocals, background vocals
- Kim Eana – lyrics
- Chelcee Grimes – composition, arrangement
- Christian Vinten – composition, arrangement
- Lee Joo-hyung – vocal directing, Pro Tools operating
- Kim Cheol-sun – recording, mixing
- Jang Woo-young – digital editing
- Tom Coyne – mastering

== Charts ==
=== Weekly charts ===
Chart (2016)	Peak position
South Korean Singles (Gaon)	2
US World Digital Songs (Billboard)	5

=== Monthly chart ===
Chart (2016)	Position
South Korea (Gaon)	2

=== Year-end chart ===
Chart (2016)	Position
South Korea (Gaon)	89

== Sales ==
Region	Sales
South Korea	2,500,000
United States	3,000

== Accolades ==
Year-end lists
Critic/Publication	List	Rank	Ref.
Billboard	20 Best K-Pop Songs of 2016: Critic's Picks	7	

== Release history ==
Region	Date	Format	Label
Worldwide	November 1, 2016	Digital download	S.M. Entertainment
