= Kwon Yu-ri filmography =

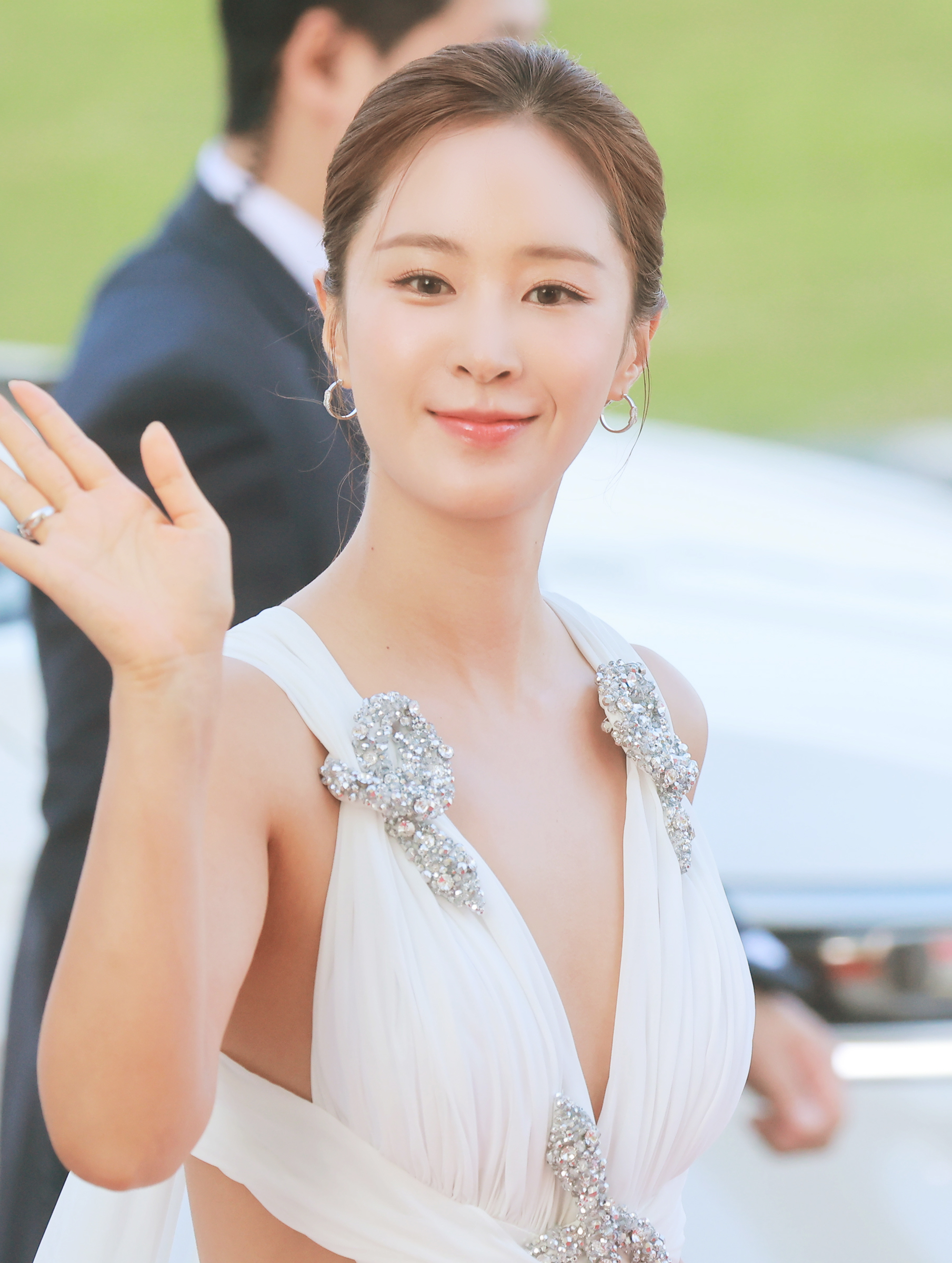
- Kwon at the 2nd Blue Dragon Series Awards in 2023
- Film: 6
- Television series: 14
- Web series: 1
- Television show: 15
- Web show: 1
- Hosting: 2

Kwon Yu-ri (known mononymously as Yuri), is a South Korean singer and actress. She is a member of girl group Girls' Generation and its subgroup Girls' Generation-Oh!GG.

Kwon has appeared in numerous Korean television series and films since 2007. She made her acting debut in the sitcom Unstoppable Marriage in 2007. Over the years, she has starred in dramas such as Fashion King (2012), Local Hero (2016), Bossam: Steal the Fate (2021), and Good Job (2022). In film, Kwon appeared in No Breathing (2013) and later received praise for her role in Dolphin (2023), further establishing her career as an actress alongside her work in music.

== Film ==
| Year | Title | Role | Notes | Ref. |
|---|---|---|---|---|
| 2007 | Attack on the Pin-Up Boys | Ballerina | Cameo | |
| 2012 | I AM. – SM Town Live World Tour in Madison Square Garden | Herself | Biographical film of SM Town | |
| 2013 | No Breathing | Jung-eun | | |
| 2015 | SMTown The Stage | Herself | Documentary film of SM Town | |
| 2024 | Dolphin | Na-young | Independent film | |
| 2025 | Somebody | Kim Min | Mystery thriller | |

== Television series ==
| Year | Title | Channel | Role | Notes | Ref. |
|---|---|---|---|---|---|
| 2007–2008 | Unstoppable Marriage | KBS | Kwon Yu-ri | | |
| 2012 | Fashion King | SBS | Choi An-na | | |
| 2015 | Kill Me, Heal Me | MBC | Ahn Yo-na | Cameo (Episode 20) | |
| 2016 | Local Hero | OCN | Bae Jung-yeon | | |
| 2017 | Innocent Defendant | SBS | Seo Eun-hye | | |
| 2018 | The Sound of Your Heart: Reboot | Netflix | Choi Ae-bong | Seasons 1–2 | |
| 2018 | Dae Jang Geum Is Watching | MBC | Bok Seung-ah | | |
| 2020 | Break-up Suspension | SBS | Park Ga-ram | | |
| 2021 | Bossam: Steal the Fate | MBN | Yi Soo-kyung | | |
| 2021 | Racket Boys | SBS | Im Seo-hyun | Cameo (Episode 16) | |
| 2022 | Good Job | ENA | Don Se-ra | | |
| 2024 | Lovely Runner | TVN | Herself | Cameo (Episode 1) | |
| 2024 | Parole Examiner Lee | TVN | Ahn Seo-yoon | | |
| 2025 | The Art of Negotiation | JTBC | Song Ji-oh | Cameo (Episode 7 & 8) | |

== Web series ==
| Year | Title | Role | Ref. |
|---|---|---|---|
| 2016 | Gogh, The Starry Night | Go Ho | |

== Television shows ==
| Year | Title | Role | Notes | Ref. |
|---|---|---|---|---|
| 2008 | You Can Fly | Special MC | with Leeteuk | |
| 2008 | Kko Kko Tours Single Single: Season 2 | Main cast | | |
| 2009–2010 | Invincible Youth | Main cast | Episode 1–32, 42 | |
| 2009–2012 | Show! Music Core | Co-host | with Tiffany | |
| 2013 | Dancing 9: Season 1 | Coach | with Hyoyeon | |
| 2015 | Animals | Main cast | Episode 1–5 | |
| 2015 | MAPS | Host | | |
| 2015 | Our Neighborhood Arts and Physical Education | Main cast | Swimming – (episode 113–124) | |
| 2015 | The Rallyist | Host | | |
| 2016 | Law of the Jungle | Main cast | New Caledonia episodes | |
| 2018 | Kim Je-dong's Talk to You: Season 2 | Co-host | | |
| 2018 | Rooftop Makgeolli | Main cast | | |
| 2021 | My Teenage Girl | Class teacher | | |
| 2022 | Off The Grid | Main cast | | |
| 2022–2024 | The Zone: Survival Mission | Cast member | Season 1–3 | |
| 2023, 2024, 2026 | Business Genius Baeksajang (season 1-3) | Fixed Cast member | with Baek Jong-won, Lee Jang-woo and John Park | |

== Hosting ==
| Year | Title | Notes | Ref. |
|---|---|---|---|
| 2009 | Incheon Korean Music Wave | with Tiffany and Oh Sang-jin | |
| 2010 | Incheon Korean Music Wave | with Tiffany and Oh Sang-jin | |
| 2011 | MBC Korean Music Wave in Bangkok | with Tiffany and Nichkhun | |
| 2011 | Incheon Korean Music Wave | with Tiffany and Oh Sang-jin | |
| 2011 | K-Pop All Star Live in Niigata | with Tiffany and Sooyoung | |
| 2013 | Incheon Korean Music Wave | with Tiffany | |
| 2014 | MBC Korean Music Wave in Beijing | with Tiffany | |
| 2022 | 8th APAN Star Awards | with Jung Il-woo | |
| 2024 | Asia Star Entertainer Awards 2024 (ASEA) | with Ok Taec-yeon | |
