= To the Beautiful You (soundtrack) =

To The Beautiful You: Original Soundtrack

Soundtrack album by various artists
- Released: September 19, 2012
- Recorded: S.M. Studios in Seoul, 2012
- Genre: Soundtrack, K-pop
- Length: 35:51 (soundtrack); 28:25 (score)
- Language: Korean
- Label: S.M. Entertainment, KMP Holdings
- Producer: Lee Soo Man (producer)

Singles from To The Beautiful You
- 1. "To the Beautiful You OST Part 1" Released: August 15, 2012; 2. "To the Beautiful You OST Part 2" Released: August 22, 2012; 3. "To the Beautiful You OST Part 3" Released: August 29, 2012; 4. "To the Beautiful You OST Part 4" Released: September 5, 2013

To the Beautiful You (Hangul: 아름다운 그대에게 OST) is the original soundtrack album to the 2012 South Korean television drama series of the same name which aired from August 15 to October 4, 2012 on SBS for 16 episodes. The album contains a total of ten soundtracks, eight of which were released as four A-side and B-side digital singles prior to the full release of the album on September 19, 2012. The album was produced by record label agency S.M. Entertainment while its artists lend their voices for the songs. Additionally, the original score of the series was also included in the album.

== Singles ==
=== Butterfly ===
"Butterfly" was released as the A-side of the first single from the album on August 15, 2012. The sisters, Jessica of Girls' Generation and Krystal of f(x), teamed up to perform their first duet together. The modern pop-rock song was composed by a team of European music producers that included Matthew Tishler, Andrew Ang and Susan Markle. Tishler had worked with S.M. Entertainment before on BoA's "Don't Know What To Say" and TVXQ's "She". The lyrics were penned by Kenzie, one of the resident composers from the agency. "Butterfly" was used as the theme song for the love line between the male and female leads from the series.

=== Stand Up ===
"Stand Up" was released as B-side of the first single and was also chosen as the lead single from the album and the main theme song from the drama series. The pop-rock song was the Korean debut performance by J-Min, an solo artist under S.M. Entertainment who had been mostly active in Japan. Apart from composing the song, Groovie. K also provided the lyrics for the song. The music producer had worked with the record agency before on TVXQ's "Tri-Angle" and Super Junior's "Don't Don". The music video for "Stand Up" was released along with the full album release on September 19, 2012. Aside from featuring early scenes from the drama series, it also included a guest appearance by TRAX's Jungmo. The band version of the music video was unveiled on October 4, 2012. J-Min and Jungmo performed a special stage on Inkigayo on August 26, 2012.

=== It's Me ===
"It's Me" was released as the A-side of the second single from the album on August 22, 2013. It was written by the music producer Zig Zag Note. The lyrics were a work of the music producer duo Lee Sang-yeol and Park Geun-cheol who also worked on a few other songs from the soundtrack album of the drama series. Sunny of Girls' Generation and Luna of f(x) teamed up for collaboration for the first time and provided the vocals for the "cheerful" and "up-lifting" song. The duet peaked at spot 25 of Gaon Weekly Singles Chart.

=== In Your Eyes ===
"In Your Eyes" is a ballade performed by Onew of boy group Shinee. The track was included as the B-side of the second single which also included "It's Me". Both songs were written and composed by Lee Sang-yeol and Park Geun-cheol. The music producing duo had previously composed many tracks of the critically acclaimed City Hunter OST. They also penned the lyrics for the musical piece. The song peaked at spot 60 of Gaon Singles Chart.

=== Closer ===
"Closer" was released as the A-side of the fourth single on September 5, 2012 and was also the highest-charting song from the album, peaking at spot 7 on Gaon Weekly Singles Chart. The song was composed by Kenzie who has been working with S.M. Entertainment for many years while the lyrics were penned by Kim Jeong-bae. Kim Taeyeon, member of the pop group Girls' Generation, delivered the vocals for the song. The soft melody of the song was used as a theme to the growing love between the lead characters Kang Tae Joon (Choi Minho) and Goo Jae Hee (Sulli), once after it is revealed to Tae Joon that Jae Hee is actually a girl. The same day, the accompanying music video for "Closer" was unveiled on S.M. Entertainment's official channel on YouTube, featuring scenes from the drama series.

== Track listing ==
Original soundtrack
No.	Title	Lyrics	Music	Artist	Length
1.	"Butterfly"	Kenzie	Matthew Tishler, Andrew Ang, Susan Markle	Jessica, Krystal	3:01
2.	"일어나" (Stand Up)	Groovie. K	Groovie. K	J-Min	2:50
3.	"나야" (It's Me)	Lee Sang-yeol, Park Geun-cheol	Zig Zag Note	Sunny, Luna	3:42
4.	"In Your Eyes"	Lee Sang-yeol, Park Geun-cheol	Lee Sang-yeol, Park Geun-cheol	Onew	4:27
5.	"Rise & Shine" (아름다운 그대에게; To The Beautiful You)	Jo Yoon-kyung	Johanna Elkesdotter	Kyuhyun, Tiffany	4:00
6.	"SKY"	Lee Sang-yeol, Park Geun-cheol	Lee Sang-yeol, Park Geun-cheol	Super Junior-K.R.Y	4:42
7.	"가까이" (Closer)	Kim Jeong-bae	Kenzie	Taeyeon	4:03
8.	"어쩌면 우린" (Maybe We...)	Lee Sang-yeol, Park Geun-cheol	Lee Sang-yeol, Park Geun-cheol, Kim Jae-hyun	Dana	3:50
9.	"너란 말야" (U)	Kim Woo-joo, Zua, A Real Man	Zua, A Real Man	Taemin	3:35
10.	"Butterfly" (Acoustic version)	Kenzie	Matthew Tishler, Andrew Ang, Susan Markle	Jessica, Krystal	3:01
Total length:					35:51

Original score
No.	Title	Artist	Length
1.	"Road to Winning"	Isangyeol	1:49
2.	"The Flying Boy"	Isangyeol	1:37
3.	"I'm a Transfer"	Isangyeol	1:20
4.	"Love is All Around"	Isangyeol	1:57
5.	"Love, Love, Love"	Isangyeol	3:00
6.	"Oh! Lovely Day"	Isangyeol	1:16
7.	"My Mom's Memories"	Isangyeol	2:28
8.	"The Day"	박근철 (Park Geun-cheol)	2:22
9.	"Windows of My Eyes"	박근철	2:06
10.	"Nervous Dream"	박근철	1:39
11.	"Fallen Angel"	박근철	1:40
12.	"One Fine Day"	박근철	1:23
13.	"One Somber Day"	박근철	1:14
14.	"Good Man"	박근철	1:40
15.	"Stay Forever"	박근철	2:54
Total length:			28:25

== Reception ==
=== Albums chart ===
Country	Chart	Peak position
South Korea	Gaon' Weekly albums chart	4
South Korea	Gaon Monthly albums chart	?

=== Singles chart ===
Song	Peak position	
Song	KOR	Billboard KOR
"Butterfly"	22	
"Stand Up"	123	
"It's Me"	25	
"In Your Eyes"	60	
"Rise & Shine"	37	
"Sky"	127	
"Closer"	7	
"Maybe We..."	138	
"U"	107	
