= Sunny (singer) =

South Korean and American singer (born 1989)

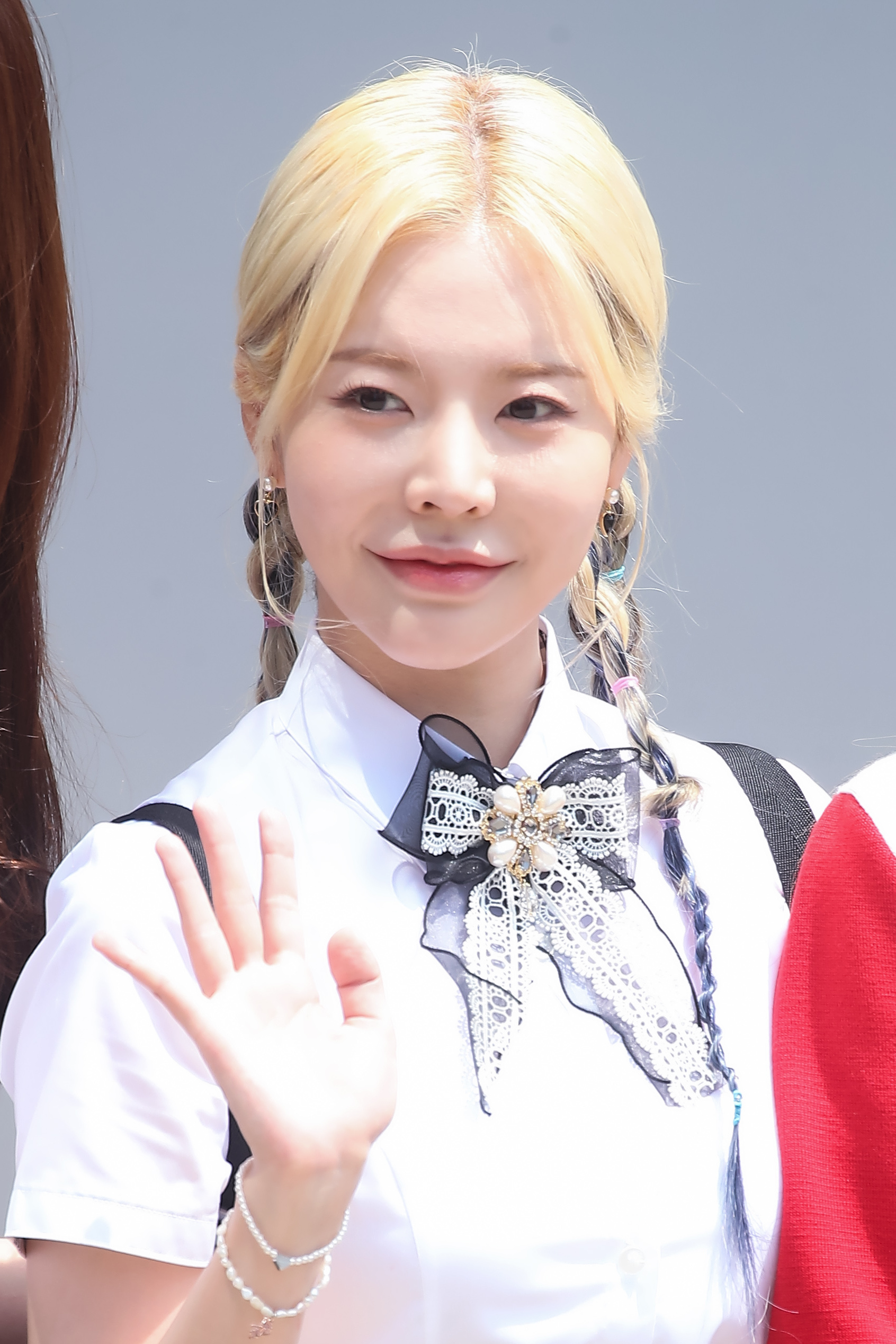
- Sunny in 2022
- Born: Susan Soonkyu Lee; May 15, 1989 (age 37); Orange County, California, U.S.
- Other name: Lee Soon-kyu
- Citizenship: United States; South Korea
- Occupations: Singer; entertainer
- Agent: A2O
- Relatives: Lee Soo-man (uncle)
- Musical career
- Origin: Seoul, South Korea
- Instrument: Vocals
- Years active: 2007–present
- Labels: SM; A2O
- Member of: Girls' Generation; Girls' Generation-Oh!GG
- Formerly of: SM Town
- Website: Official website at the Wayback Machine (archived October 16, 2023)

Korean name
- Hangul: 이순규
- RR: I Sungyu
- MR: I Sun'gyu

Signature
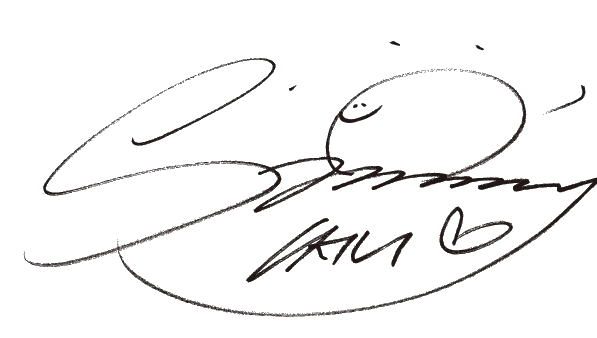

Susan Soonkyu Lee (born May 15, 1989), known professionally as Sunny (Korean: 써니), is a South Korean and American singer and entertainer based in South Korea. She debuted as a member of girl group Girls' Generation (and later its subgroup Girls' Generation-Oh!GG) in August 2007, which went on to become one of the best-selling artists in South Korea and one of South Korea's most widely known girl groups worldwide. Apart from her group's activities, Sunny has participated in numerous side projects including original soundtracks, television variety shows, musical acting and radio hosting.

== Life and career ==
=== 1989–2007: Early life and career beginnings ===
Sunny was born on May 15, 1989, in Orange County, California, United States. Her family consists of her parents and two older sisters who are ten and fifteen years older than her. She and her sisters share the same birthday. Sunny's paternal uncle is Lee Soo-man, the founder of SM Entertainment. While she was still an infant, her family moved to Kuwait. After the outbreak of the Gulf War, Sunny and her family returned to South Korea and settled in Jongno-gu, Seoul. She attended Seoul Cheongun Elementary School, Paiwha Girls' Middle School and Paiwha Girls' High School. Sunny was influenced to become a singer by her father, who was in a college band. In 1998, Sunny joined SM Entertainment and became a trainee for five years. She transferred to Starworld Agency, where her father worked as a manager, and was to debut in a duo group called Sugar. The group, however, never came to fruition. In early 2007, singer Ayumi Lee convinced Sunny to rejoin SM Entertainment. She continued her training there and made her official debut as a member of Girls' Generation in August 2007. The group gained significant popularity with the release of their hit single "Gee" in 2009.

=== 2008–present: Acting and solo projects ===
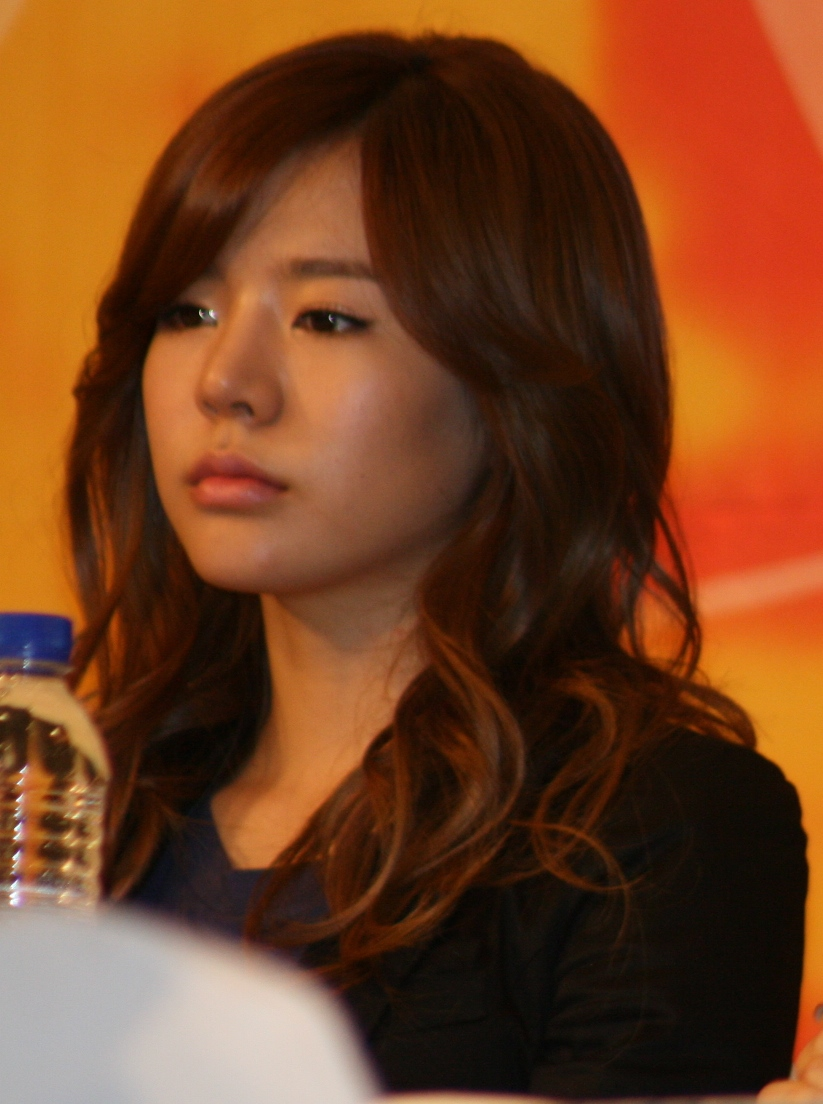
Sunny at the 6th Asia Song Festival in 2009

Aside from Girls' Generation's activities, Sunny has participated in a number of side-projects. In early 2008, Sunny worked as a co-host of the Melon Chunji Radio with Super Junior's Sungmin. In August 2008, she contributed a solo song, "You Don't Know About Love" for the SBS's drama Working Mom. In 2009, Sunny released two songs—a solo track "Finally Now" for the interactive movie Story of Wine and a duet "It's Love" for the MBC's drama Heading to the Ground, with Girls' Generation's member Taeyeon.

During 2009 and 2010, Sunny was a co-host for MTV Korea television music program The M with SS501's Kim Hyung-jun and 2AM's Im Seulong. She also joined the KBS2's variety show Invincible Youth along with Girls' Generation member Yuri. The reality program narrated a journey of a group of South Korean celebrities who were brought together to work and experience the agricultural and rural life. In March 2010, Sunny recorded "Your Doll" for the SBS's drama Oh! My Lady soundtrack—it became her first song to enter the Gaon Digital Chart, at number 88.

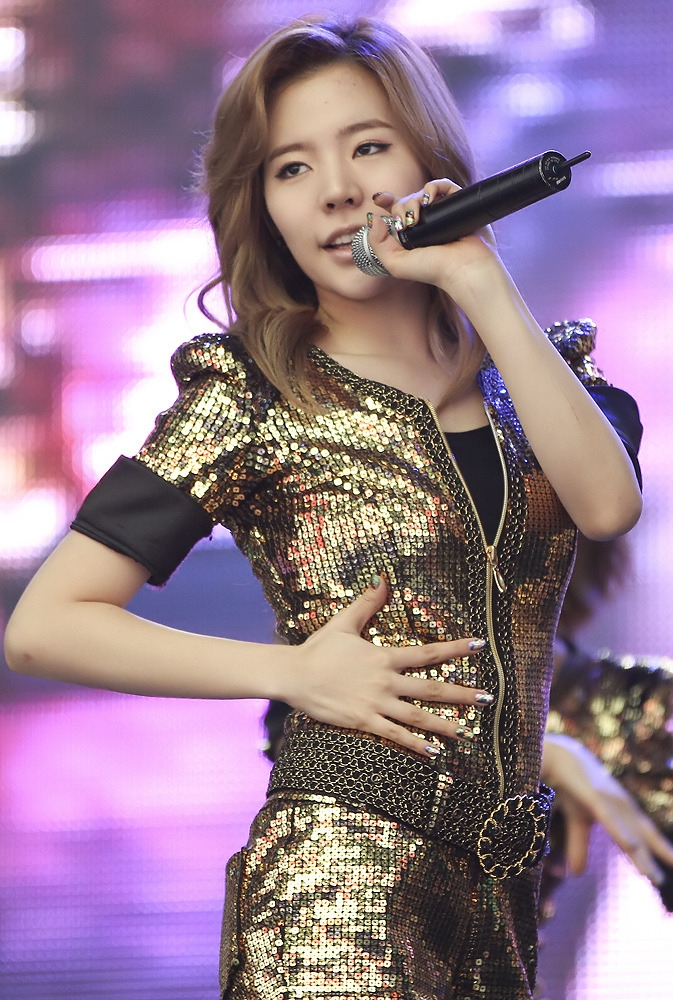
Sunny performing at Angel Price Music Festival in 2011

During 2011 and 2012, she continued on with her participation in KBS2's Invincible Youth 2. She was praised by the director of the show as someone who has "intelligence", "great adaptability" and the ability to make other cast members get along well.

In January 2012, stepping into the field of voice-over for the first time, she was featured in the Korean-dubbed version of animated film The Outback. She voiced a koala character named Miranda. She later said that voicing the strong-willed character was initially difficult without being able to act out the scenes physically, but that the director's guidance helped her understand the role. In March 2012, Sunny became a host for SBS MTV's television program Music Island. During the year, she also recorded two duets—the first song is titled "I Love You, I Love You", with Brown Eyed Girls' member Miryo while the other one is titled "It's Me", with f(x)'s Luna for the SBS's drama To the Beautiful You. The songs debuted at number 56 and 25 on the Gaon Digital Chart and at number 51 and 16 on Billboard's K-pop Hot 100 chart, respectively.

During 2012–2013, Sunny was cast in her first musical, Catch Me If You Can, based on the true story and life of a con man named Frank Abagnale. The story was turned famous by the 2002 movie of the same name. She played a character named Brenda, who is the girlfriend of the male lead. Her performance received favorable reviews. Shin Yeong-seon of The Chosun Ilbo praised her understanding of the character and her comic portrayal of Brenda, while Jang Kyung-jin of 10Asia highlighted her clear, strong vocals in the song "Fly, Fly Away". Sunny was nominated for the "Best New Actress" at the 6th Musical Awards. In June 2013, Sunny released the song "The 2nd Drawer" for the MBC's drama The Queen's Classroom. It debuted at number 76 on K-pop Top 100 Chart.

In March 2014, Sunny participated in the Korean-dubbed version of the animated film Rio 2. She voiced Jewel, a female Spix's macaw. The director noted on her ability to not only deliver the lines, but also successfully expressed other sound effects, like breathing. In an interview, Sunny felt that the most appealing part of dubbing is the ability to go back to her childhood. In June 2014, Sunny was cast in her second musical, Singin' in the Rain, based on the 1952 movie of the same name. Sunny played Kathy Selden, an aspiring actress. In November 2014, her solo song, "First Kiss", was released as a part of musician Hwang Sung Je's Project Super Hero series.

Between 2014 and 2015, she became a cast member of the SBS's reality show Roommate. The show featured a group of celebrities living together, sharing the house as well as household tasks. During the same period, Sunny hosted the MBC radio show's FM Date. She contributed her own self-written logo song for the show and also won the "Rookie Radio DJ Award" at the year-end MBC Entertainment Awards. In April 2015, Sunny's voice was featured on indie-band Roof Top House's debut single "Heart Throbbing". The song managed to enter Gaon Digital Chart at number 89. In August-October 2015, she was a co-host for the short-lived JTBC's variety show Serial Shopping Family.

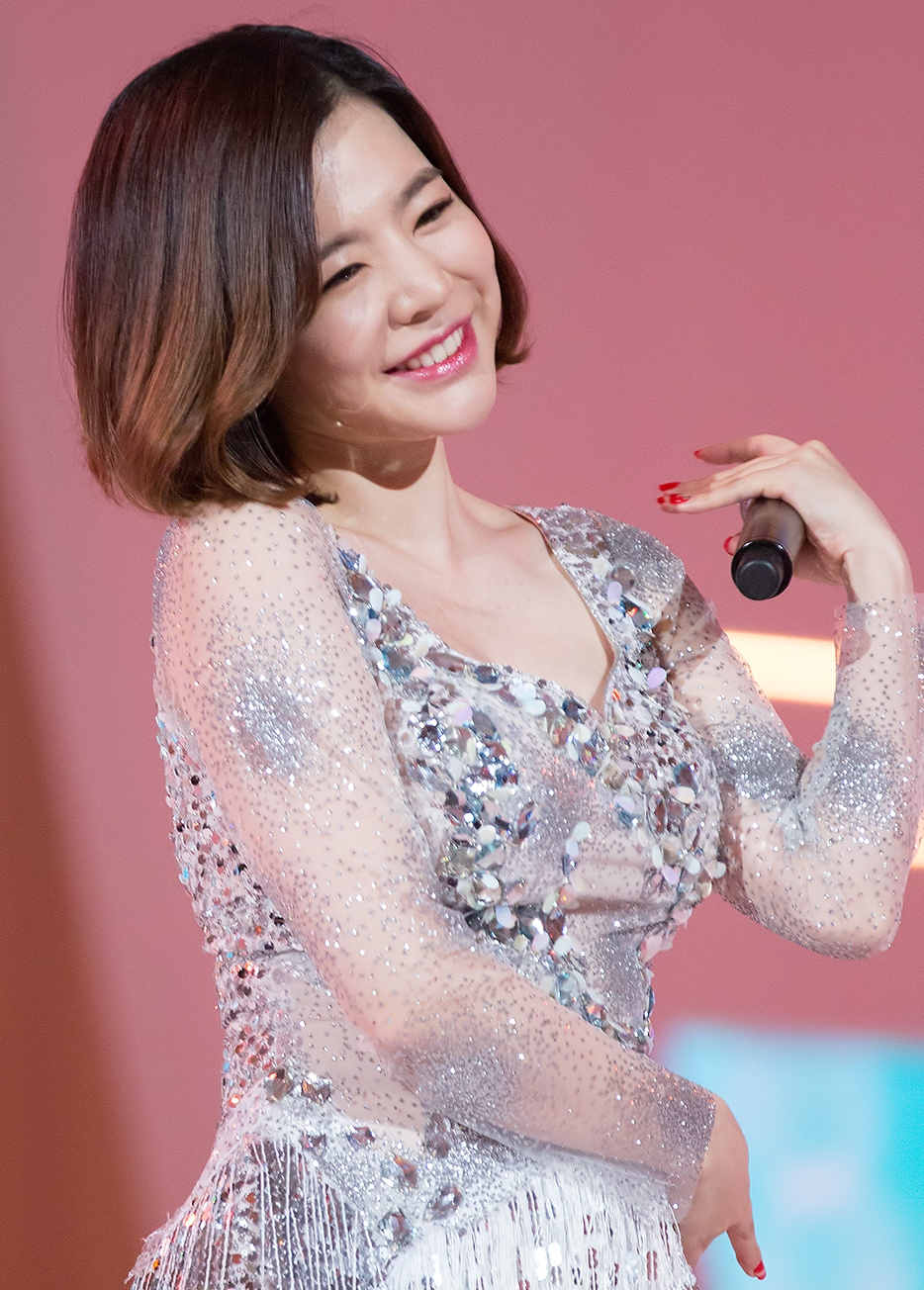
Sunny at Style Icon Asia in 2016.

In March 2016, it was revealed that Sunny would be a celebrity judge in the new show, Vocal War: God's Voice. The purpose of the show is to create a one-on-one vocal battle between veteran singers in Korea and talented amateur vocalists. Starting from June 2016, Sunny joined the main cast of the JTBC variety show Cheonhajangsa (천하장사), a show featuring various traditional markets.

In August 2023, Sunny left SM after her exclusive contract with the company ended.

In April 2025, Sunny signed an exclusive contract with A2O Entertainment. The agency stated that she was training as a producer under Yoo Young-jin, while also mentoring its trainees, designing training programs, and assisting with styling and choreography. This new agency was established by her uncle, Lee Soo-man, the former executive producer of SM Entertainment.

In August 2025, she volunteered as the audio guide narrator for a climate crisis exhibition at the Gyeonggi Museum of Modern Art.

== Discography ==
=== Singles ===
==== As lead artist ====
Title	Year	Peak chart positions	Sales	Album
Title	Year	KOR	Sales	Album
"Heart Throbbing" (심쿵주의보) (with Rooftop House Studio)	2015	89	KOR: 21,799	Rooftop Project The 1st Album
"U&I" (쟤 보지 마) (with Henry)	2017	—	—N/a	Non-album single
"—" denotes releases that did not chart.

==== As featured artist ====
Title	Year	Album
"Time" (Hitchhiker featuring Sunny, Hyoyeon and Taeyong)	2018	Non-album single

==== Promotional singles ====
Title	Year	Album
"First Kiss"	2014	Hwang Sung Je Project Superhero 3rd Line Up

==== Collaborations ====
Title	Year	Peak chart positions		Sales	Album
Title	Year	KOR	KOR Hot (Note: The Billboard K-pop Hot 100 chart launched in 2011 and was discontinued in 2014. On the issue dated May 29 – June 4, 2017, the chart was re-established.)	Sales	Album
"I Love You, I Love You" (Miryo featuring Sunny)	2012	56	51	KOR: 102,375	MIRYO aka JOHONEY

==== Soundtrack appearances ====
Title	Year	Peak chart positions		Sales	Album
Title	Year	KOR	KOR Hot	Sales	Album
"You Don't Know About Love" (사랑을 몰라요)	2008	—	—	—N/a	Working Mom OST
"Finally Now"	2009	—	—	—N/a	Story of Wine OST
"It's Love" (사랑인걸요) (with Taeyeon)	2009	—	—	—N/a	Heading to the Ground OST
"Your Doll" (그대 인형)	2010	88	—	—N/a	Oh! My Lady OST
"It's Me" (나야) (with Luna)	2012	25	16	KOR: 218,992	To the Beautiful You OST
"The 2nd Drawer" (두 번째 서랍)	2013	—	76	KOR: 30,346	The Queen's Classroom OST
"Odd Imagination" (with Henry)	2018	—	—	—N/a	Two Yoo Project - Sugar Man 2 Part 6
"Collar" (옷깃)	2021	—	—	—N/a	Bossam: Steal the Fate OST
"Your Bright Smile Is on the Clouds in the Sky" (너의 환한 미소가 하늘 구름 위에 있어)	2021	—	—	—N/a	Let Me Be Your Knight OST
"—" denotes releases that did not chart.

==== Other appearances ====
Title	Year	Peak chart positions	Sales	Album
Title	Year	KOR	Sales	Album
"3" (Note: Song was released under Girls' Generation, but is a solo track performed by Sunny.)	2013	—	—N/a	2011 Girls Generation Tour (Live)
"You Are A Miracle" (with various artists)	2013	32	KOR: 53,496	SBS Gayo Daejun: Friendship Project
"Sound of Your Heart" (너의 목소리) (with Steve Barakatt, as part of SM Town)	2016	—	—N/a	S.M. Station Season 1
"—" denotes releases that did not chart.

== Filmography ==
=== Film ===
Year	Title	Role	Notes	Ref.
2012	The Outback	Miranda	Voice-over for the Korean-dubbed version	
2012	I AM. – SM Town Live World Tour in Madison Square Garden	Herself	Biographical film of SM Town	
2014	Rio 2	Jewel	Voice-over for the Korean-dubbed version	
2015	SMTown The Stage	Herself	Documentary film of SM Town	

=== Television series ===
Year	Title	Role	Notes	Ref.
2008	Unstoppable Marriage	Bulgwang-dong's Seven Princesses Gang	Cameo (episode 64)	
2009	Hilarious Housewives	Sunny	Cameo (episode 126)	
2011	Sazae-san: Special 3	Sunny	Cameo	

=== Television shows ===
Year	Title	Role	Notes	Ref.
2009–2010	The M	Co-host		
2009–2012	Invincible Youth	Regular cast	Season 1 (episodes 1–32, 37, 38, 51); Season 2 (episodes 1–31)	
2012	Music Island	Main host		
2013	Real Men	Narrator		
2014–2015	Roommate	Regular cast	Season 2	
2015	Shopping Family	Main host		
2016	Star Advent	Main host		
2016	Strong Man	Regular cast		
2017	Snowball Project	Regular cast		
2017	Hyena on the Keyboard: Pilot	Main host		
2017	A Man Who Feeds The Dog	Narrator	Season 2	
2017–2018	To You, From Me	Regular cast		
2018	Real Life Men and Women	Regular cast		
2018	Love Translation	Regular cast		
2018	Supermodel 2018 Survival	Performance mentor		
2018–2019	Video Star	Main host	Season 2 (episodes 91–115)	
2019	Shall We Chicken?	Main host		
2021–present	Beauty and Luxury 6	Host		
2021	Spicy Girls	Cast member		
2024	No Way Home	Main host	with Hyoyeon	

=== Web shows ===
Year	Title	Role	Notes	Ref.
2021	Idea Panda	Host	with Lee Eun-ji and Kim Poong	
2021	Legendary Trainee	Host		
2021	Love Catcher in Seoul	Host		

=== Radio shows ===
Year	Title	Role	Notes	Ref.
2008	Melon Chunji Radio	Co-DJ	with Super Junior's Sungmin	
2014–2015	MBC FM4U's Sunny's FM Date	DJ		

== Musical theatre ==
Year	Title	Role	Notes
2012–2013	Catch Me If You Can	Brenda Strong	Lead role
2014	Singin' in the Rain	Kathy Selden	Lead role
2016–2017	Cafe-in ~Mr Sommelier Miss Barista		Lead role, Japanese musical

== Awards and nominations ==
Name of the award ceremony, year presented, category, nominee of the award, and the result of the nomination
Award ceremony	Year	Category	Nominee / Work	Result	Ref.
MBC Entertainment Awards	2014	Rookie Radio DJ Award	Sunny's FM Date	Won	
Mnet 20's Choice Awards	2010	Hot Female Multitainer	Sunny	Nominated	
Musical Awards	2012	Best New Actress	Catch Me If You Can	Nominated	
