= Good Job (TV series) =

2022 South Korean television series

- Promotional poster
- Hangul: 굿잡
- RR: Gutjap
- MR: Kutchap
- Genre: Mystery; Fantasy; Romance
- Created by: Ryu Seung-jin
- Developed by: KT Studio Genie (planning)
- Written by: Kim Jeong-ae; Kwon Hee-kyung
- Directed by: Kang Min-gu; Kim Seong-jin
- Starring: Jung Il-woo; Kwon Yu-ri
- Music by: Baek Eun-woo
- Country of origin: South Korea
- Original language: Korean
- No. of episodes: 12

Production
- Executive producer: Park Min-seol
- Producers: Hwang Chang-woo; Jo Hye-rin; Kim Jae-ha; Nam Ki-ho
- Editors: Oh Sang-hwan; Kim Jung-min
- Running time: 60 minutes
- Production companies: Production H; Yein E&M

Original release
- Network: ENA
- Release: August 24 – September 29, 2022

Good Job (Korean: 굿잡) is a 2022 South Korean television series starring Jung Il-woo and Kwon Yu-ri. It is an original drama of OTT media service Seezn, and is available for streaming on its platform. It also aired on ENA from August 24 to September 29, 2022, every Wednesday and Thursday at 21:00 (KST).

== Synopsis ==
The series revolves around a genius and athletic chaebol who lives a double life as a detective, and a poor woman who has cheerful personality and was born with super vision but tries to hide her ability by wearing thick glasses.

After his mother was murdered 20 years earlier, Eun Seon-woo secretly works as a private detective to find the real culprit. The story begins when a necklace belonging to his mother, which disappeared on the day of the murder, suddenly appears at an auction.

== Cast ==
=== Main ===
- Jung Il-woo as Eun Seon-woo
- Kwon Yu-ri as Don Se-ra

=== Supporting ===
- Eum Moon-suk as Yang Jin-mo
- Song Sang-eun as Sa Na-hee
- Jo Young-jin as Kang Wan-su
- Yoon Sun-woo as Kang Tae-hoon
- Lee Jun-hyeok as Chief Hong
- Hong Woo-jin as Kim Jae-ha
- Cha Rae-hyung as Han Kwang-gi
- Shin Yeon-woo as Lee Dong-hee

=== Extended ===
- Shin Go-eun as Oh Ah-ra
- Min Chae-eun as Han Soo-ah
- Lee Na-ra as Park Eun-jung
- Bae Eun-woo as Ra Min-ji

=== Special appearance ===
- Kim Jung-hwa as Seon-woo's mother

== Production ==
It was reported that filming was scheduled to begin in April 2022.

On July 20, 2022, the production team announced that the main director of Good Job—Ryu Seung-jin would change his position to creator and would work on the script to improve the overall quality of the series. He was replaced by director Kang Min-gu.

Jung Il-woo and Kwon Yu-ri starred together for the second time in a television series, following <Bossam: Steal the Fate>.

== Original soundtrack ==
=== Part 1 ===
Released on August 24, 2022
| No. | Title | Lyrics | Music | Artist | Length |
|---|---|---|---|---|---|
| 1. | "Closer" | Elum (Prismfilter); Jeon Jenny | Park Ki-tae (Prismfilter); BuildingOwner (Prismfilter); Nmore (Prismfilter); Lee Beom-hoon (Prismfilter); Ohway! (Prismfilter); Bir$day (Prismfilter); Glenn (Prismfilter); Elum (Prismfilter); Jozu; Jeon Jenny | Jay B; Youngjae | 3:12 |
| 2. | "Closer" (Inst.) | | Park Ki-tae (Prismfilter); BuildingOwner (Prismfilter); Nmore (Prismfilter); Lee Beom-hoon (Prismfilter); Ohway! (Prismfilter); Bir$day (Prismfilter); Glenn (Prismfilter); Elum (Prismfilter); Jozu; Jeon Jenny | | 3:12 |
| Total length: | | | | | 6:24 |

== Viewership ==
Good Job : South Korea viewers per episode (thousands)

| Season | Episode number | | | | | | | | | | | |
| Season | 1 | 2 | 3 | 4 | 5 | 6 | 7 | 8 | 9 | 10 | 11 | 12 |
|---|---|---|---|---|---|---|---|---|---|---|---|---|
| 1 | 555 | 445 | 508 | 638 | 453 | 494 | 409 | 575 | 407 | 526 | 453 | 483 |

Source: Audience measurement performed nationwide by Nielsen Korea.

Average TV viewership ratings
| Ep. | Original broadcast date | Average audience share (Nielsen Korea) | |
| Ep. | Original broadcast date | Nationwide | Seoul |
|---|---|---|---|
| 1 | August 24, 2022 | 2.322% (4th) | 2.205% (4th) |
| 2 | August 25, 2022 | 2.219% (3rd) | 2.124% (3rd) |
| 3 | August 31, 2022 | 2.330% (4th) | 2.383% (4th) |
| 4 | September 1, 2022 | 3.175% (2nd) | 3.079% (2nd) |
| 5 | September 7, 2022 | 2.056% (5th) | 2.243% (4th) |
| 6 | September 8, 2022 | 2.251% (3rd) | 2.456% (3rd) |
| 7 | September 14, 2022 | 2.150% (4th) | 2.586% (4th) |
| 8 | September 15, 2022 | 2.853% (4th) | 3.203% (2nd) |
| 9 | September 21, 2022 | 2.078% (4th) | 2.205% (4th) |
| 10 | September 22, 2022 | 2.508% (3rd) | 2.545% (3rd) |
| 11 | September 28, 2022 | 2.130% (5th) | 2.549% (4th) |
| 12 | September 29, 2022 | 2.296% (3rd) | 2.715% (3rd) |
In the table above, the blue numbers represent the lowest ratings and the red numbers represent the highest ratings.; This series aired on a cable channel/pay TV which normally has a relatively smaller audience compared to free-to-air TV/public broadcasters (KBS, SBS, MBC and EBS).
