= The First Scene =

EP by Yuri
- Released: October 4, 2018
- Recorded: 2017–2018
- Studios: SM Studios, Seoul, South Korea
- Genres: R&B; dance pop
- Length: 20:47
- Language: Korean
- Labels: SM; IRIVER; Universal Music; Island
- Producer: Lee Soo-man (exec.)

Singles from The First Scene
- 1. "빠져가 (Into You)" Released: October 4, 2018

The First Scene is the debut extended play by South Korean singer Yuri. It was released on October 4, 2018 by SM Entertainment and distributed by IRIVER. The album debuted at number two on the Gaon Album Chart in its first week and also charted at number ten on Billboard's World Albums chart.

== Background ==
The First Scene was recorded between 2017 and 2018 and was difficult to prepare due to Yuri's tight schedule with her acting career, reality TV filming and various activities with her group, Girls' Generation. In January 2018, after the release of her single "Always Find You" featuring DJ Raiden, Yuri addressed her fans' requests for a solo album on the SBS Power FM radio show Park So Hyun's Love Game and stated that "the timing wasn't right" but she's "always thinking about it and preparing for it". She then said that if they're willing to wait, she will "release one at any time". On September 20, it was reported that the singer was planning on making her solo debut, 11 years into her career, through the release of an album which was subsequently confirmed by a source from her label SM Entertainment.

On September 27, SM Entertainment posted a series of teasers for the album on their official SNS accounts, which Forbes stated exuded "confident sensuality" that would have been unthinkable years ago when the group's "brand of peppy girlishness was at its peak". Yuri wanted her album to reflect her personal image in her group, so she made sure it showed "sexiness, femininity and beauty". A timeline for the remaining teasers and the release of the album was also included, along with some details about the extended play which will contain six tracks, including the lead single "Into You (빠져가)". Yonhap News also reported that Yuri planned on doing active promotions for the album. The album was released on October 4, 2018.

== Composition ==
Tamar Herman of Billboard described the title track "Into You" as "a rhythmic dance track with a captivating melody". She also wrote that throughout the song, Yuri "plays up her airy tone, vacillating between piano-backed croons and dramatic belts over whirring synths as she pulls back and lets loose, letting her vocals blend with pulsating, rumbling beats, and one-off quirks, like the popping sound of a champagne bottle being opened, to create a soundscape of a dreamy night out". At her debut showcase on October 4, Yuri revealed that the Girls' Generation unit Oh!GG's debut song "Lil' Touch", which was released the previous month and Yuri was also a part of, was one of the two choices for her debut single but the company ultimately went with "Into You" since "Lil' Touch" was faster and would fit a group more.

Herman characterized the second track "Illusion" as a groovy dance track, "C'est La Vie! (That's LIFE!)" as a creeping retro-pop track, "Butterfly" as a bossa nova song and "Chapter 2" as a ballad.

== Promotions ==
Yuri appeared as a guest on the October 3, 2018 episode of the MBC variety show Weekly Idol where she discussed her upcoming debut album and performed a snippet of her song. She held a debut showcase in Seoul on October 4, 2018, which was broadcast live through the Naver app V Live. There, the singer performed the single "Into You" live for the first time, along with another track from the album, "Illusion". She also discussed her preparations for the album. Yuri had her debut stage on the music program Music Bank on October 5, 2018, performing both "Into You" and "Illusion". The singer also performed the two songs on Show! Music Core and Inkigayo.

== Reception ==
Upon its release, The First Scene topped the iTunes album chart in more than 14 countries and debuted at number 10 on Billboard's World Albums chart in its first week with only one day to garner points to enter it. The album charted at number two on the Gaon Album Chart.

== Track listing ==
Track listing for The First Scene
No.	Title	Lyrics	Music	Arrangement	Length
1.	"빠져가 (Into You)"	January 8th (Jam Factory)	Jihad Rahmouni; Léon Paul Palmen	Rahmouni; Palmen	3:06
2.	"꿈 (Illusion)"	Jang Jung-won (Jam Factory)	Dakarai Gwitira; Tyler Shamy; Trevor Klaiman; Kaitlyn Olson	Gwitira; Shamy; Klaiman; Olson	3:47
3.	"C'est La Vie! (That's LIFE!)"	danke (lalala studio); Kim Tae-hyun (lalala studio)	Curtis Richardson; Adien Lewis; Ruby Prophet; Emmanuel "Silent-Man" Freeman; Giovanny "Givano" Hooper	Richardson; Lewis; Prophet; Silent-Man; Givano	3:57
4.	"Butterfly"	Seo Ji-eum	Daniel "Obi" Klein; Andreas Öberg; Charli Taft	Klein; Öberg; Taft	2:49
5.	"Chapter 2"	Jo Yoon-kyung	Mick Lee; Jeppe Reil; Thomas Reil; Freya Goddard; Ryan S. Jhun	Jeppe Reil; Thomas Reil; Ryan S. Jhun	3:46
6.	"Ending Credit (To be continued)"	Lee Seu-ran	Maria Marcus; Laila Samuelsen	Maria Marcus	3:17
Total length:					20:47

== Charts ==
Chart (2018)	Peak position
South Korean Albums (Gaon)	2
US World Albums (Billboard)	10

== Release history ==
Region	Date	Format	Label
South Korea	October 4, 2018	CD; digital download	SM Entertainment; IRIVER
Various	October 4, 2018	Digital download	SM Entertainment
