= No Breathing =

- Promotional poster for No Breathing
- Hangul: 노브레싱
- RR: Nobeuresing
- MR: Nobŭresing
- Directed by: Jo Yong-sun
- Written by: Yoo Young-ah; Jo Yong-sun
- Produced by: Lee Song-joon; Lee Geun-wook; Park Chang-hyun; Jung Dae-hoon; Park Se-joon; Park Do-won
- Starring: Seo In-guk; Lee Jong-suk; Kwon Yuri
- Cinematography: Lee Joon-gyu
- Edited by: Heo Sun-mi
- Music by: Marco
- Production companies: 9ers Entertainment; Soo Jack Films; Union Investment Partners
- Distributed by: Cineguru/Daou Tech
- Release date: October 30, 2013
- Running time: 118 minutes
- Country: South Korea
- Languages: Korean; English
- Box office: US$2,781,101

No Breathing (Korean: 노브레싱) is a 2013 South Korean sports drama film set in the world of competitive swimming, starring Seo In-guk, Lee Jong-suk and Kwon Yuri. The film was released in theaters on October 30, 2013. As of 2014, it sold approximately 451,669 admissions in Korea only.

== Plot ==
Like his swimming champion father, Won-il (Seo In-guk) was once a promising swimmer. But when his father dies during a swimming competition (where he was doing his specialty called "no breathing"), soon followed by his mother's death, Won-il quits swimming for good. Instead, he lives life hopelessly and recklessly, like there is no tomorrow. With Won-il in danger of being expelled from school, his father's longtime friend Jae-suk (Park Chul-min) drags him to a physical education-focused high school, hoping that he'll start swimming again. There he meets his long-ago rival, Woo-sang (Lee Jong-suk) who in the past had always been overshadowed by Won-il. With Won-il's absence from the sport, Woo-sang is now in first place and is a national swimming star. But he gets disqualified from the national tryouts after getting into trouble, so he has to start from ground zero and ends up at the same phys-ed school as Won-il. Woo-sang is Won-il's complete opposite in personality, and all he cares about is winning so he finds Won-il's return to the sport unwelcome. Then there is Jae-suk's daughter, Jung-eun (Kwon Yuri) who captures both Won-il and Woo-sang's hearts and further reignites the rivalry between them. The two very different young men begin training for an upcoming swimming competition, battling for love and friendship as they undergo the rite of passage of growing up.

== Cast ==
=== Main characters ===
- Seo In-guk as Jo Won-il
  - Yoo Seung-yong as young Won-il

A swimming prodigy who stopped participating in the sport, and now wants to make a comeback. He is a headstrong, impulsive, and live-for-the-moment kind of guy.

- Lee Jong-suk as Jung Woo-sang
  - Nam Da-reum as young Woo-sang

A national swimmer who is uptight and aloof, and hails from a privileged family.

- Kwon Yuri as Jung-eun
  - Kim Bo-min as young Jung-eun

A girl with a carefree personality who dreams of becoming a musician. She grew up with the boys as children.

=== Supporting characters ===
- Shin Min-chul as Jung-dong
- Kim Jae-young as Dae-chan
- Park Chul-min as Jae-suk
- Park Jung-chul as Coach Jang
- Sunwoo Jae-duk as Woo-sang's father
- Ah Young as Se-mi
- Oh In-hye as High school female coach
- Jeon Bo-mi as Ha-na
- Kim Nam-hee as Won's friend
- Lee Chang-joo as Woo-hyun
- Park Hyun-woo as Jo Min-gook
- Jung Min-sung as announcer
- Park Yong-sik as head of swimming association
- Kim Young-sun as Woo-sang's mother
- Kim Jung-hak as reporter Han

== Production ==
The film began shooting on May 19, 2013. One of the locations was Davao in the Philippines, where the overseas field training scenes were shot, as well as the movie poster.

== Release ==
=== South Korea ===
On the day of its release on October 30, 2013, No Breathing drew 44,707 admissions and ranked 4th on the Korean box office. The film sold a total of 451,669 tickets during its domestic run, grossing ₩2,991,824,739 (or US$2,781,101).

=== International ===
The film also received a theatrical release in other Asian countries in December 2013, namely Singapore (December 5), Hong Kong (December 12), Taiwan (December 13), and Vietnam (December 28). The film grossed over $22,655 on its opening weekend in Singapore, grossing $38,740 during its two-week run. On its opening weekend in Hong Kong, it grossed $35,728 and a total of $53,729 at the end of its run.

== Soundtrack ==
On October 22, 2013, CJ E&M Music released two singles for the film, both sung by Kwon Yuri: "Bling Star" and "반짝반짝 (Twinkle Twinkle)."
