= Invincible Youth =

- Genre: Reality television
- Starring: See below
- Voices of: Sunny (episodes 1–31); Goo Hara (episodes 31–58)
- Opening theme: Ready, Get Set, Go! by Peppertones; Rockstar by Hannah Montana
- Ending theme: All About You by McFly
- Country of origin: South Korea
- Original language: Korean
- No. of seasons: 2
- No. of episodes: 104

Production
- Executive producer: Kim Ho-sang
- Production locations: Yuchi-ri, Nam-myeon, Hongcheon, Gangwon Province, South Korea (Season 1); Daebudo, Ansan, South Korea (Season 2)
- Camera setup: Multi-camera setup
- Running time: 60-70 minutes

Original release
- Network: Korean Broadcasting System
- Release: October 23, 2009 – November 17, 2012

Invincible Youth (Korean: 청춘불패; Hanja: 靑春不敗; RR: Cheongchunbulpae) is a South Korean variety show which aired its first season on KBS2 from October 23, 2009 to December 24, 2010. Season 1 featured seven girls (collectively known as G7) from K-pop idol groups wherein they experience how it is to live and survive in the Korean rural outdoors. It started its second season on November 12, 2011 featuring eight girls.

== Background ==
=== Season 1 ===
The first season of the show involved Korean entertainers meeting weekly to work and learn about farming in a Yuchi-ri village in Hongcheon County, Gangwon Province, South Korea. This involved both agricultural work, interacting with members of an aging rural community, and competing in challenges involving agrarian or domestic tasks. As the show's popularity grew, the cast and crew began work to make their filming location a sustainable site for agritourism, enter produce in food competition, and promote environmentally conscious farming. Some of the products were sold within the local community, to the general public, or distributed as gifts.

The G7 girls initially included Narsha of Brown Eyed Girls, Sunhwa of Secret, Hyuna of 4Minute, Hyomin of T-ara, Sunny and Yuri of Girls' Generation, and Hara of Kara.

On Friday, May 14, 2010, the PD of the show Kim Ho-sang announced that Sunny, Yuri, and Hyuna would be leaving the show due to scheduling conflicts with their respective groups' overseas promotions. Their replacements were decided through private auditions with members of other K-pop girl groups.

On May 30, it was confirmed that After School's Jooyeon, f(x)'s Victoria and Kim Sori will become the three new members of G7 on Invincible Youth. Kim Jong-min (of Koyote) also became a semi-permanent member for a month under the moniker of being a "Variety show mentor" for the new members.

On the August 27th episode, it was announced that Kim Tae-woo will be taking a temporary leave of absence due to a surgery he is to receive for his throat. He vowed to come back to the show as soon as he makes a full recovery. Starting episode 44, Song Eun-i filled in as a semi-permanent MC in Kim Tae-woo's absence. On December 8, 2010, it was revealed that Invincible Youth finished recording their finale episode. They had filmed for over one year, since October 2009.

In an interview with Star News on December 10, production director (PD) Kim Sang-ho said, "We're not discontinuing the show because of low viewer ratings. There has been a lot of conflicting schedules due to girl groups like KARA expanding their activities overseas. It was difficult to take out some of the fixed members, so we decided to end season one for now. There's a lot of trust being placed on the worth of the Invincible Youth brand. After discussions with other producers, everyone agreed to end season one and go ahead with season two next year."

Season 1 Slogan: 청춘은 지지 않는다~ 청춘~ 불패 (Youth Don't Lose! Invincible Youth!)

=== Season 2 ===
Executive producer (CP) Kim Ho-sang told Star News on August 31 that the second season will take place in a fishing village in Daebu Island, Ansan, Gyeonggi Province.

G8 members included Girls' Generation's Sunny and Hyoyeon, Amber (f(x)), Suzy (miss A), Bora (Sistar), Yewon (Jewelry), Ko Woo-ri (Rainbow), Jiyoung (Kara). Lee Soo-geun, Ji Hyun-woo and Boom served as MC's. Sunny is the only returning member from Season 1, although Hyoyeon, Jiyoung and Bora were guests during the previous season.

The first episode of Invincible Youth 2 premiered on November 12, 2011 in South Korea, while the international premiere on KBS World was on December 2, 2011.

Prior to the airing of the April 7th episode, multiple news reports were released confirming that cast members Lee Soo-geun, Ji Hyun-woo, Amber and Woori will be leaving the show. Season 1 cast member Kim Shin-young returned as an MC starting from the April 14th episode.

It was then later revealed that Sunny would also be leaving the show. As she was the only member from season 1, they agreed that she would stay on with season 2 until the program became somewhat stable. She left the show after the July 7th episode. Comedian Lee Young-ja was cast afterwards, starting with the July 21st episode.

Invincible Youth 2 stopped airing in mid-November due to scheduling conflicts with the cast members as well as low ratings. The final episode was filmed November 7 and aired on November 17.

Season 2 Slogan: 청춘이여 영원하라! 청춘~ 불패 (Youth is Forever! Invincible Youth!)

== Cast members ==
=== Season 1 ===
==== Hosts ====
Cast (Hangul)	Date	Nicknames	Notes
Nam Hee-suk (남희석)	23 October 2009 – 12 December 2009	Nam MC; Uncle Hee-suk	Left for personal reasons
Noh Joo-hyun (노주현)	23 October 2009 – 24 December 2010	Village Chief; Hulk	
Kim Tae-woo (김태우)	23 October 2009 – 24 December 2010	Bear Tae-woo; Immature Fool Of Yuchiri	Went on temporary leave after episode 44 in order to undergo throat surgery
Kim Shin-young (김신영)	23 October 2009 – 24 December 2010	Pig (Don) Chef; Korea's Famous Comedian	
Song Eun-i (송은이)	10 September 2010 – 24 December 2010	Song Senior	Temporary replacement for Kim Tae-woo

==== G7 members ====
Cast (Hangul)	Date	Nicknames	Group
Narsha (나르샤/박효진)	23 October 2009 – 24 December 2010	Adult-Dol; Reusha; Hyojin; Miss Laminate	Brown Eyed Girls
Hyomin (효민/박선영)	23 October 2009 – 24 December 2010	Folding Screen; CEO (Completely Edited Out); Wall flower Naming Master; Hyoderella	T-ara
Sunhwa (한선화)	23 October 2009 – 24 December 2010	White Paper; Wet Feet Girl; Blank Sunhwa; Airhead Sunhwa	Secret
Hara (구하라)	23 October 2009 – 24 December 2010	Haragoo; Goossain Bolt; Stealthy Hara; Quick-Mouth Hara; Thief Hara	Kara
Sunny (써니/이순규)	23 October 2009 – 11 June 2010	Soonkyu; Chicken Catcher Aegyo (Cute)	Girls' Generation
Yuri (권유리)	23 October 2009 – 11 June 2010	Class-President Yul; Yoochi-ri Village's Daughter in Law; Yoga Instructor Yuri	Girls' Generation
Hyuna (김현아)	23 October 2009 – 11 June 2010	Maknae; Producer Kim; Jing Jing (Whiny) Hyuna	4Minute
Kim Sori (김소리)	18 June 2010 – 24 December 2010	Vein Sori; Sona Lisa	Solo Artist
Victoria (빅토리아/송치엔/宋茜)	18 June 2010 – 24 December 2010	Wu Lin Girl; Censor Vic; Victory	f(x)
Jooyeon (이주연)	18 June 2010 – 24 December 2010	Clumsy Jooyeon; Dead Weight (Jim) Jooyeon	After School

=== Season 2 ===
==== Hosts ====
Cast (Hangul)	Date	Nicknames	Notes
Boom (붐)	12 November 2011 – 17 November 2012	Min-ho; Gotta Get That; Big Nose	
Ji Hyun-woo (지현우)	12 November 2011 – 7 April 2012	Hyung-tae	
Lee Soo-geun (이수근)	12 November 2011 – 7 April 2012	Uncle Soo-geun; Lee Soo-geun 2NE1	
Kim Shin-young (김신영)	14 April 2012 – 17 November 2012	44 Shin-young; Empty Stomach	
Lee Young-ja (이영자)	21 July 2012 – 17 November 2012	Mom (Eomma)	

==== G8 members ====
Cast (Hangul)	Date	Nicknames	Group
Hyoyeon (김효연)	12 November 2011 – 17 November 2012	Hyoding (Kid Hyoyeon); Yoghurt Ajumma; Sancho; Breaky; Breakomaneci	Girls' Generation
Yewon (김예원)	12 November 2011 – 17 November 2012	Laminate; Ducushong; U-Go-Girl; Fish Market Aunty; Chitty Chitty; Bongsuni; Un-Grown; Katydid	Jewelry
Bora (윤보라)	12 November 2011 – 17 November 2012	Bosain Bolt; Nacho; Ggamanova Boraski; Alba; Lucky Icon; Infant	Sistar
Jiyoung (강지영)	12 November 2011 – 17 November 2012	Jigoo (Ji-fool); Am-Tell Girl; Dacushong; All-Grown; Giant Baby	Kara
Suzy (배수지)	12 November 2011 – 17 November 2012	Nation's First Love; Giant Maknae; Jobless; Him Suzy; King Feet 285mm from Gwangju; Bacushong; Eonnyeoni; Grown-feet	miss A
Ko Woo-ri (고우리)	12 November 2011 – 7 April 2012	Granny	Rainbow
Amber (엠버/유일운/劉逸雲)	12 November 2011 – 7 April 2012	Eunyoung; Terminator; The Rising Star in Farming	f(x)
Sunny (써니/이순규)	12 November 2011 – 7 July 2012	Soonkyu; 60's Sunny; Louisoddong; Gaeddongi/Dog Dung; Grasshopper	Girls' Generation

== List of special guests ==
=== Season 1 ===
Episode Number	Airdate	Guest stars	Notes
Episode 6	November 29, 2009	Minho (SHINee)	
Episode 10	December 25, 2009	Go Se-won; Park Hwi-sun; Son Hoyoung (g.o.d); Onew (SHINee); Im Seulong (2AM); Heo Kyung-hwan	Christmas Special
Episode 18	February 19, 2010	Heechul (Super Junior); B2ST; Yeon Jung-hoon; Lee Kye-in; Nicole Jung (Kara); Hyoyeon (Girls' Generation)	
Episode 19	February 26, 2010	Roh Yoo-min; Shindong (Super Junior)	Replaced Kim Tae-woo who held a concert in the United States
Episode 20	March 5, 2010	Lee Kye-in	Episode also featured the cast from the documentary Old Partner
Episode 22	March 19, 2010	Sooyoung (Girls' Generation)	Replaced Yuri who could not participate due to the swine influenza
Episode 23	March 26, 2010	Sooyoung (Girls' Generation); Koo Jun-yup; Ock Joo-hyun	
Episode 24	April 9, 2010	Koo Jun-yup	
Episode 26	April 30, 2010	Ham Eunjung (T-ara); Kim Jong-min (Koyote)	Ham Eunjung replaced Hara who did not appear due to Kara's sponsorship promotions in Thailand
Episode 27	May 7, 2010	Lee Joon (MBLAQ); Jeong Jun-ha	
Episode 29	May 21, 2010	Cast Gag Concert	Referred to as "Gag 7" in reference to "G7"
Episode 30	May 28, 2010	Cast Gag Concert	Referred to as "Gag 7" in reference to "G7"
Episode 36	July 9, 2010	Secret; Shin Ji (Koyote)	Surprise guests for G7's Special Army Concert
Episode 37	July 16, 2010	Sunny	Special invitation for G7's trip to Japan
Episode 38	July 23, 2010	Sunny	Special invitation for G7's trip to Japan
Episode 39	July 30, 2010	Jung Myung-hoon; Go Joo-won	
Episode 40	August 6, 2010	MBLAQ	
Episode 41	August 13, 2010	MBLAQ; Jiyeon (T-ara); Lee Seok-hoon (SG Wannabe); Park Hyun-bin	Summer Vacation Special
Episode 42	August 20, 2010	Yuri	Special invitation for G7's Farm Products Exhibition
Episode 43	August 27, 2010	2PM; Lizzy (After School); JeA (Brown Eyed Girls)	Replacing Hara and Victoria who were absent due to their respective group's promotions in Japan
Episode 44	September 10, 2010	Karam (The Boss); Kim Young-chul; Song Eun-i	
Episode 48	October 8, 2010	Park Gwang-hyun	
Episode 51	October 29, 2010	Sunny; Hyuna; Go Joo-won; Lee Kye-in; Chung Myung-hoon; Kim Tae-woo	1 Year Anniversary Special, Part 1
Episode 52	November 5, 2010	Luna, Sulli, Krystal (f(x)); Song Jieun (Secret); Kang Jiyoung (Kara)	1 Year Anniversary Special, Part 2
Episode 53	October 8, 2010	Bora (Sistar)	
Episode 54	November 26, 2010	Bora (Sistar)	Replacing Hara and Narsha who were absent due to their respective group's promotions in Japan
Episode 55	December 3, 2010	Taemin (SHINee)	Replacing Victoria
Episode 58 (Finale)	December 24, 2010	Kim Tae-woo	Surprise Appearance

=== Season 2 ===
Episode Number	Airdate	Guest stars	Notes
Episode 9	January 15, 2012	Im Ha-ryong	
Episode 12	February 25, 2012	Song Dae-kwan; Tae Jin-ah	Missing Sunny and Hyoyeon due to Girls' Generation's promotions in America
Episode 17	March 31, 2012	2AM	
Episode 19	April 14, 2012	Choi Hong-man	Kim Shin-young debut and missing Jiyoung but appear later in the show
Episode 20	April 20, 2012	Shinhwa	
Episode 21	April 27, 2012	Jung Yong-hwa, Lee Jung-shin (CNBLUE)	Missing Jiyoung
Episode 22	May 5, 2012	Jung Yong-hwa, Lee Jung-shin (CNBLUE); Taeyeon (Girls' Generation); Narsha (Brown Eyed Girls)	Replacing Bora and Suzy
Episode 23	May 12, 2012	Gong Hyung-jin	Missing Jiyoung but appear later in the show
Episode 24	May 19, 2012	Sung Min (Super Junior)	
Episode 25	May 26, 2012	Park Sang-myun; Hyuna, Sohyun (4minute)	Missing Jiyoung
Episode 26	June 2, 2012	Andy (Shinhwa); L (Infinite); Lee Hyun-woo; Baek Sung-hyun; Kang Kyun-sung; Park Hwi-sun	Missing Sunny, Hyoyeon, Bora, Jiyoung
Episode 27	June 9, 2012	Joo Sang-wook; In Gyo-jin; Hyomin (T-ara); Sunhwa (Secret)	Missing Sunny and Hyoyeon but they appear later in the show
Episode 28	June 16, 2012	Jo Min-ki; Son Byong-ho	
Episode 29	June 23, 2012	Kang Dong-ho; Kang Ji-sub; Goo Hara (Kara)	Replacing Bora who did not appear due to Sistar's music video shooting in Hawaii (Hara), Dano Special
Episode 30	June 30, 2012	Baek Ji-young	
Episode 31	July 7, 2012	Jo Kwon (2AM); Lee Joon (MBLAQ); Hwang Kwanghee (ZE:A)	Sunny farewell
Episode 33	July 28, 2012	Wooyoung (2PM)	
Episode 37	September 1, 2012	B2ST	Initially missing Hyoyeon but she appears later in the show
Episode 38	September 8, 2012	Chung Hoon; Cho Jun-Ho; Song Dae-Nam; Kim Jae-Bum (2012 South Korea Judo Olympic Team)	
Episode 44	November 3, 2012	Taru Salminen; Abigail Cancian; Brownwyn Mullen; Bianca Mobley (Global Talk Show)	Missing Jiyoung

== Music ==
Season 1: During Season 1, a short clip of "I Can Do Better" by Avril Lavigne is played at the start of each episode. "Rockstar" by Miley Cyrus was used as an opening theme for a number of early episodes. A medley of songs by the American rock group Journey performed by the cast of the American television show Glee was used to open several of the final episodes. The ending theme of every episode is a track titled "All About You" by an English pop rock group named Mcfly.

Season 2: During Season 2 the ending theme for episode 1 through to episode 7 is "I'm Yours" by Jason Mraz. In subsequent episodes, the ending theme is "I Will" by The Beatles. After the cast change, it has since been replaced with promotions for PVs.

== Awards ==
Year	Ceremony	Category	Recipient	Result	Ref.
2009	22nd KBS Entertainment Awards	Best Newcomer	Kim Shin-Young	Won	
2010	23rd KBS Entertainment Awards	Best female MC	Yuri	Nominated	
2010	23rd KBS Entertainment Awards	Best female MC	Goo Hara	Won	
2010	16th Hongcheon WaxyCorn King Festival	Special Prize	Invincible Youth	Won	
2010	Bugs Music Awards	Top Variety Star	Narsha	Nominated	

=== Other recognitions ===
Year	From	Category
2010	Ministry for Food, Agriculture, Forestry and Fisheries	Appreciation Plaque
2010	Korea Rural Community Corporation	President's Commendation

== Media release ==
In Japan, Invincible Youth received a DVD release in 5 Volumes released on May 3, 2011 under Broadway Entertainment. The show was re-released in 9 volumes on June 3 of the same year. The second season was released in Japan in 11 volumes on August 5 and October 7, 2011.

KBS's official YouTube channel KBS World released the full show on YouTube on 2013. The first season gathered over 22,000,000 views while the second season experienced a drastic fall in views gathering only about 2,000,000 views. Overall the show amassed over 25,000,000 views making it one of the channel's most-watched shows of all time.
