= Oh!GG =

South Korean girl group

Girls' Generation-Oh!GG
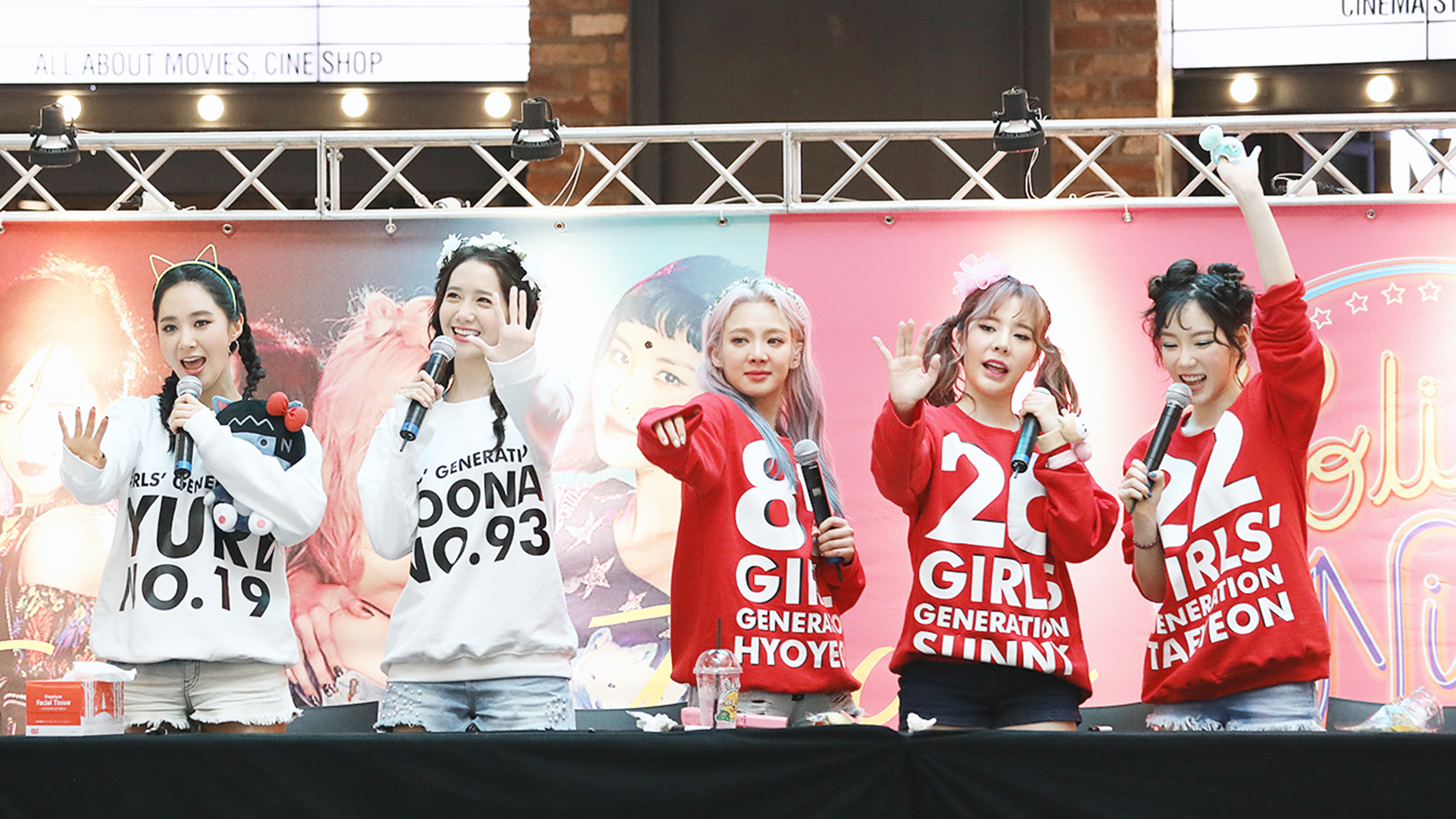
- Oh!GG at fansigning event in August 2017; From left to right: Yuri, Yoona, Hyoyeon, Sunny, and Taeyeon

Background information
- Origin: Seoul, South Korea
- Genre: K-pop
- Years active: 2018–present
- Label: SM
- Spinoff of: Girls' Generation
- Members: Taeyeon; Hyoyeon; Yuri; Sunny; Yoona

Girls' Generation-Oh!GG (Korean: 소녀시대-Oh!GG) is the second sub-unit of South Korean girl group Girls' Generation, formed by SM Entertainment in 2018. Composed of the five Girls' Generation members who remained with the agency after the expiration of their contracts: Taeyeon, Hyoyeon, Yuri, Sunny, and Yoona. The group debuted in September 2018 with the single "Lil' Touch".

== History ==
On October 9, 2017, Girls' Generation members Seohyun, Tiffany, and Sooyoung decided to leave SM Entertainment, effectively putting the group on hiatus. The label later announced the group was not disbanded, and future involvement with the three members and Girls' Generation would be discussed.

On August 2, 2018, SM Entertainment revealed that Girls' Generation would be forming a new unit group, and that more details would be revealed soon. On August 27, SM Entertainment unveiled Girls' Generation-Oh!GG as the group's second unit, consisting of the members still signed to the label. The group made its debut on September 5 with the single "Lil' Touch", which was released in both digital and physical formats. The single contained the title track "Lil' Touch", and a B-side entitled "Fermata" as well their instrumentals. "Lil' Touch" was initially one of the two choices for member Yuri's debut single, with the second being "Into You" but the company gave "Lil' Touch" to the group since it was faster and they believed it suited a group more.

On December 9, 2021, it was revealed that Oh!GG would be participating in SM Town's upcoming winter album titled 2021 Winter SM Town: SMCU Express and online concert in 2022. On December 21, it was announced the group would be releasing "Melody" as part of the winter album.

== Discography ==
=== Single albums ===
List of single albums, showing selected details, selected chart positions, and sales figures
Title	Details	Peak chart positions	Sales
Title	Details	KOR	Sales
Lil' Touch (몰랐니)	Released: September 5, 2018; Label: SM Entertainment, Dreamus; Formats: Kihno kit, digital download, streaming; Track listing: 1. "Lil' Touch" (몰랐니); 2. "Fermata" (쉼표); 3. "Lil' Touch" (몰랐니; Inst.); 4. "Fermata" (쉼표; Inst.)	3	KOR: 43,732 (Kihno)

=== Singles ===
List of singles, showing year released, selected chart positions, and name of the album
Title	Year	Peak chart positions					Album
Title	Year	KOR		JPN Hot	NZ Hot	US World	Album
Title	Year	Gaon	Hot	JPN Hot	NZ Hot	US World	Album
"Lil' Touch" (몰랐니)	2018	7	4	33	39	3	Lil' Touch
"—" denotes a recording that did not chart or was not released in that territory

=== Other charted songs ===
List of other charted songs, showing year released, selected chart positions, and name of the album
Title	Year	Peak chart positions	Album
Title	Year	KOR Gaon	Album
"Fermata" (쉼표)	2018	— (Note: "Fermata" did not enter Gaon Digital Chart, but debuted and peaked at position 30 and position 68 on component Download Chart and BGM Chart, respectively.)	Lil' Touch
"Melody"	2021	— (Note: "Melody" did not enter Gaon Digital Chart, but debuted and peaked at position 60 on component Download Chart.)	2021 Winter SM Town: SMCU Express
"—" denotes a recording that did not chart or was not released in that territory

== Videography ==
=== Music videos ===
Year	Title	Director(s)	Ref.
2018	"Lil' Touch" (몰랐니)	Vikings League	

== Filmography ==
=== Television shows ===
Year	Title	Ref.
2018	Girls for Rest	

== Awards and nominations ==
Name of the award ceremony, year presented, category, nominee of the award, and the result of the nomination
Award ceremony	Year	Category	Nominee / Work	Result	Ref.
Mnet Asian Music Awards	2018	Best Unit	Girls' Generation-Oh! GG	Nominated	
Mnet Asian Music Awards	2018	Song of the Year	"Lil' Touch"	Nominated	
Seoul Music Awards	2019	Bonsang Award	Girls' Generation-Oh! GG	Nominated	
Seoul Music Awards	2019	K-Wave Popularity Award	Girls' Generation-Oh! GG	Nominated	
Seoul Music Awards	2019	Popularity Award	Girls' Generation-Oh! GG	Nominated	
Soribada Best K-Music Awards	2019	Popularity Award	Girls' Generation-Oh! GG	Nominated	
