= Somebody (film) =

2024 film by Kim Yeo-jeong and Lee Jeong-chan

- Theatrical release poster
- Hangul: 침범
- Lit.: Invasion
- RR: Chimbeom
- MR: Ch'imbŏm
- Directed by: Kim Yeo-jeong; Lee Jeong-chan
- Screenplay by: Kim Yeo-jeong; Lee Jeong-chan
- Based on: Somebody by: Kong Se-ri; Youngyoungyi
- Produced by: Yoon Hye-Jin; Lee Kang-il
- Starring: Kwak Sun-young; Kwon Yu-ri; Lee Seol
- Cinematography: Kim Dong-hyuk
- Edited by: Kim Sung-hoon
- Music by: Lee Tae-hyun
- Production company: Studio Santa Claus Entertainment
- Distributed by: Studio Santa Claus Entertainment
- Release dates: October 4, 2024 (BIFF); March 12, 2025 (South Korea)
- Running time: 112 minutes
- Country: South Korea
- Language: Korean

Somebody (Korean: 침범) is a 2024 South Korean mystery thriller film written and directed by Kim Yeo-jeong and Lee Jeong-chan, based on the Naver webtoon of the same name. It stars Kwak Sun-young, Kwon Yu-ri and Lee Seol.

The film had its world premiere at the 29th Busan International Film Festival on October 4, 2024. It was released in theaters on March 12, 2025.

== Plot ==
Young-eun, a single mother, must care for her 7-year-old daughter So-hyun, who exhibits strange behavior. She struggles desperately to stop So-hyun's dangerous actions, but as a result, Young-eun's ordinary life begins to fall apart and So-hyun spirals further out of control.

20 years later, Min, who has lost all memories of her childhood, works for a crime scene cleanup company. One day, Hae-young, a cheerful-faced intruder, suddenly appears before her. As Hae-young casually wedges herself into the routine life Min has built, she begins to feel a strange sense of unease.

== Cast ==
- Kwak Sun-young as Yeong-eun
- Kwon Yu-ri as Kim Min
- Lee Seol as Hae-yeong
- Gi So-yoo as Kim So-hyun
- Shin Dong-mi as Choi Hyun-kyung

== Production ==
=== Development ===
The film was developed under the working title Mist (미스트), and produced by Studio Santa Claus Entertainment.

=== Casting ===
In 2023, Kwak Sun-young, Kwon Yu-ri and Lee Seol were reportedly cast to appear.

=== Filming ===
Principal photography of the film commenced in November 2023, and filming ended in January 2024.

== Release ==
Somebody premiered at the 29th Busan International Film Festival in Korean Cinema – Panorama section on October 4, 2024. The film was also premiered in 'Spotlight on Korea' category at 45th Hawai'i International Film Festival on 13 October 2024. It was shown in the 'Festival Favorites' section at 4th Red Sea International Film Festival on December 8, 2024. It was released theatrically on March 12, 2025, in South Korea.
