= Local Hero (TV series) =

South Korean television series

- Hangul: 동네의 영웅
- Hanja: 洞네의 英雄
- RR: Dongneui yeongung
- MR: Tongneŭi yŏngung
- Genre: Action; Thriller; Mystery; Crime
- Written by: Kim Gwan-hoo
- Directed by: Kwak Jung-hwan
- Starring: Park Si-hoo; Jo Sung-ha; Lee Soo-hyuk; Kwon Yu-ri; Jung Man-sik; Yoon Tae-young
- Country of origin: South Korea
- Original languages: Korean; English
- No. of seasons: 1
- No. of episodes: 16

Production
- Production locations: South Korea; Macau
- Running time: 60 minutes

Original release
- Network: OCN
- Release: January 23 – March 20, 2016

Local Hero (Korean: 동네의 영웅; lit. Neighborhood Hero) is a 2016 South Korean espionage television drama series, starring Park Si-hoo, Jo Sung-ha, Lee Soo-hyuk, Kwon Yu-ri and Yoon Tae-young. It was first broadcast on January 23, 2016 on OCN.

== Plot ==
Former secret agent Baek Shi Yoon (Park Si-hoo) is a well-trained human weapon. Hiding his past, he buys the bar "Neighborhood" and runs it as the owner. He gets close to the Neighborhood regulars at his bar and sympathizes with their pain. He then meets a young man, Choi Chan Gyu (Lee Soo-hyuk), who works as a temporary employee. Choi Chan Gyu wants to become a police officer, so Baek Shi Yoon trains him as a secret agent and they fight together against evil.

== Cast ==
=== Main cast ===
- Park Si-hoo as Baek Shi-yoon – A former intelligence agent, Shi-yoon was imprisoned for 3 years after a mission in Macau failed, resulting in the death of his partner, Jin Woo. After being released from prison, he bought a bar where former agents could gather. During the series, he uses the bar as a cover to investigate various crimes, and the real reason for his partner's death. As crimes happen around him, Shi-yoon can't help but provide aide to the victims, becoming "the Shadow".
- Jo Sung-ha as Im Tae-Ho – A married police officer with 3 kids, Tae-Ho manages a subcontracting company in secrecy to support his family. He hires Chan-gyu as one of his employees to keep tabs on officials and persons.
- Lee Soo-hyuk as Choi Chan-gyu – An aspiring police officer, Chan-gyu takes any job in order to take care of his father and brother. After seeing how Chan-gyu has athletic abilities (when he outran the guards at the police entrance exam), he is hired by Tae-Ho to secretly monitor a few targets who later end up dead. Because of this, he becomes a prime suspect for the disappearances, but is later vindicated. He discovers Shi-yoon's alter ego as the Shadow and asks him to train him. He has a crush on Writer Bae. In the end, he becomes a police constable.
- Kwon Yu-ri as Bae Jung-yeon – Before Shi-yoon bought the bar, Bae (often called Writer Bae because of her job) already worked part-time under President Hwang. At first she thinks Chan-gyu is the Shadow because of his hat and mask, but later on realizes that Shi-yoon is the real Shadow. She writes a fictional story based on spies, and uses Shi-yoon and President Hwang as inspiration.
- Yoon Tae-young as Yoon Sang-min
- Jung Man-sik as Jung Soo-hyuk
- Song Jae-ho as President Hwang
- Choi Yoon-so as Kim Seo-an
- Ji Il-joo as Jang Jin-woo
- Kang Kyung-hun as Kang Ri-soo
- Jin Kyung as Sun-young
- Lee Soon-won as Han Joon-hee
- Kim Bo-mi as So-mi
- Lee Cheol-min as Jo Bong-chul
- Ahn Suk-hwan as Park Sun-hoo

=== Additional cast ===
- Choi Deok-moon as Director Min
- Lee Han-wi as Team Leader Song
- Park Sun-cheon as Joo-hee
- Kang Nam-kil as Seo Joon-suk
- Kim Wook as Je-Cheol
- Yoo In-hyuk as a gang member
- Yeom Hye-ran as Park Sun-hoo wife's
- Cha Soon-bae as General Manager Hong
- Gratiano Wong as Dirty Businessman

== Production ==
The show was first announced in August 2015, with reports of Park Si-hoo making his return to the small screen through the spy thriller. Kwon Yu-ri and Lee Soo-hyuk were also in talks to play lead roles, and were later confirmed in early September. The cast had their first script reading on October 1, 2015 and the press conference was held on January 19, 2016 at the Times Square Amoris Hall in Yeongdeungpo, Seoul

Filming began in October in South Korea with some scenes filmed in Macau.
