= Dae Jang Geum Is Watching =

South Korean television series

- Promotional poster
- Also known as: Jang-geum, Oh My Grandma
- Hangul: 대장금이 보고 있다
- Lit.: The Great Jang-geum Is Watching
- RR: Daejanggeumi bogo itda
- MR: Taejanggŭmi pogo itta
- Genre: Romance
- Directed by: Sun Hye-yoon
- Starring: Shin Dong-wook; Kwon Yu-ri; Lee Yul-eum; Kim Hyun-joon; Lee Min-hyuk
- Country of origin: South Korea
- Original language: Korean
- No. of episodes: 16

Production
- Camera setup: Single-camera
- Running time: 70 minutes
- Production company: MBC Entertainment

Original release
- Network: MBC TV
- Release: October 11, 2018 – January 24, 2019

Dae Jang Geum Is Watching (Korean: 대장금이 보고 있다) is a 2018 South Korean television series starring Shin Dong-wook, Kwon Yu-ri, Lee Yul-eum, Kim Hyun-joon and Lee Min-hyuk, a work that started with the idea of how Dae Jang Geum's descendants would live. It aired on MBC TV from October 11, 2018 to January 24, 2019, every Thursday at 23:10 (KST).

== Synopsis ==
The series follows the hectic lives, romantic relationships and love for food of three siblings—Han San-hae, Han Jin-mi and Han Jeong-sik.

== Cast ==
=== Main ===
- Shin Dong-wook as Han San-hae (35 years old), the eldest of three siblings who works as a salesman.
- Kwon Yu-ri as Bok Seung-ah (28 years old), a newly recruited employee in the sales team at San-hae's company.
- Lee Yul-eum as Han Jin-mi (26 years old), San-hae and Jeong-sik's sister who has inherited a highly developed sense of smell.
- Kim Hyun-joon as Han Jeong-sik (26 years old), the youngest of the three siblings.
- Lee Min-hyuk as Min-hyuk (25 years old), a mysterious regular customer at a convenience store.

=== Supporting ===
- Jung Yi-rang as Lee Na-young
- Kim Kiri as Won Bin

=== Others ===
- Ki Do-hoon as a convenience store customer.
- Lee Sae-on as Jeon Jin-ho, Han Jin-mi's first love
- Choi Jung-won as VIP's husband (Ep. 3)

=== Special and cameo appearances ===
- Lee Hye-jung as the mother of Han siblings
- Hyebin (Ep. 1)
- Daisy (Ep. 1)
- JooE (Ep. 1)
- Nancy (Ep. 1)
- Shownu (Ep. 9-10)
- Hong Jin-young (Ep. 9)
- Im Hyun-sik as Im Heon-sik (Ep. 16)
- Peniel Shin as Donggeuniel (Ep. 16)
- Jung Il-hoon as RoongD (Ep. 16)
- Yook Sung-jae as Oh Seong-jae (Ep. 16)

== Ratings ==
Average TV viewership ratings (nationwide)
Ep.	Part	Broadcast date	Nielsen Korea
1	1	October 11, 2018	1.8%
1	2	October 11, 2018	1.3%
2	1	October 18, 2018	1.2%
2	2	October 18, 2018	1.2%
3	1	October 25, 2018	1.4%
3	2	October 25, 2018	1.1%
4	1	November 1, 2018	1.3%
4	2	November 1, 2018	1.0%
5	1	November 8, 2018	1.4%
5	2	November 8, 2018	1.4%
6	1	November 15, 2018	1.8%
6	2	November 15, 2018	1.5%
7	1	November 22, 2018	1.2%
7	2	November 22, 2018	1.3%
8	1	November 29, 2018	1.1%
8	2	November 29, 2018	1.1%
9	1	December 6, 2018	1.3%
9	2	December 6, 2018	1.2%
10	1	December 13, 2018	1.2%
10	2	December 13, 2018	1.0%
11	1	December 20, 2018	0.9%
11	2	December 20, 2018	0.8%
12	1	December 27, 2018	0.9%
12	2	December 27, 2018	0.9%
13	1	January 3, 2019	0.7%
13	2	January 3, 2019	0.7%
14	1	January 10, 2019	1.2%
14	2	January 10, 2019	1.2%
15	1	January 17, 2019	0.9%
15	2	January 17, 2019	0.7%
16	1	January 24, 2019	0.6%
16	2	January 24, 2019	0.7%
Average			1.1%
In the table above, the blue numbers represent the lowest ratings and the red numbers represent the highest ratings.
