= Kwon Yu-ri =

South Korean singer and actress (born 1989)

- Yuri in 2026
- Born: December 5, 1989 (age 36); Goyang, South Korea
- Education: Chung-Ang University
- Occupations: Singer; actress; songwriter
- Relatives: Vivian Cha (cousin)
- Musical career
- Genres: K-pop; dance-pop
- Instrument: Vocals
- Years active: 2007–present
- Label: SM
- Member of: Girls' Generation; Girls' Generation-Oh!GG; Girls' Generation-HRS; SM Town
- Website: Official website

Korean name
- Hangul: 권유리
- RR: Gwon Yuri
- MR: Kwŏn Yuri

Signature
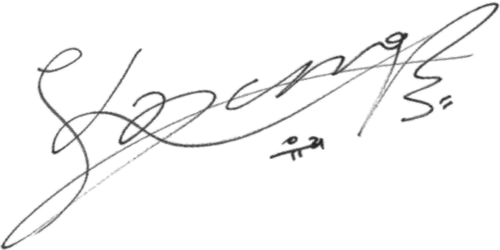

Kwon Yu-ri (Korean: 권유리; born December 5, 1989), known mononymously as Yuri, is a South Korean singer, actress, and songwriter. She debuted as a member of girl group Girls' Generation (and later its subgroup Girls' Generation-Oh!GG) in August 2007, which went on to become one of the best-selling artists in South Korea and one of South Korea's most widely known girl groups worldwide. Apart from her group's activities, she has acted in several television dramas such as Fashion King (2012), Local Hero (2016), Innocent Defendant (2017), Dae Jang Geum Is Watching (2018), Bossam: Steal the Fate (2021), Good Job (2022) and Parole Examiner Lee (2024). In 2013, she made her film debut in No Breathing. In 2018, she made her debut as a soloist with her first extended play The First Scene.

== Early life ==
Yuri was born in Deogyang District, Goyang, Gyeonggi Province, South Korea, on December 5, 1989. She has one older brother, Kwon Hyuk-joon. She auditioned at the SM Entertainment Casting System and joined the company in 2001 after finishing in second place in the 2001 SM Youth Best Dancer Contest. She then underwent training for 5 years and 11 months before her debut. She graduated from Neunggok High School in 2008. She and Sooyoung were appointed as Chung-Ang University new ambassadors on May 20, 2014. On February 15, 2016, she graduated with a degree in Theater and Film as well as receiving a Lifetime Achievement Award as Honorary Ambassador of the school at the graduation ceremony.

== Career ==
=== 2007–2010: Girls' Generation debut and solo activities ===
Yuri made her official debut as a member of the 9-member girl group, Girls' Generation in August 2007. Aside from her group's activities, she had a small role in a television segment, The King's Boyfriend, which was part of the documentary Super Junior Show by S.M Entertainment's boy group Super Junior. She also made a cameo appearance as a ballerina in the film, Attack on the Pin-Up Boys, which also stars the members of Super Junior.

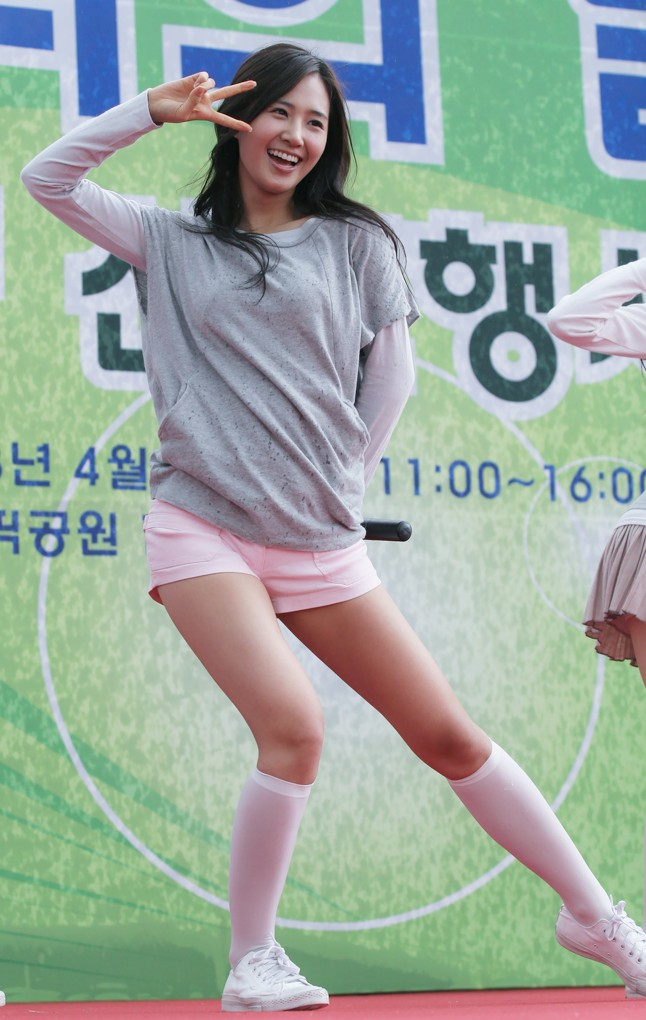
Yuri performing in 2008

In 2008, Yuri had a recurring role in the 2008 KBS2 sitcom, Unstoppable Marriage, where she played a high school student along with fellow member Sooyoung. In June, she sang a duet called "Kkok (Must!)" with Sooyoung for the soundtrack of SBS television series, Working Mom. Yuri also became a cast member in the second season of Kko Kko Tours Single♥Single, a dating show between celebrities.

In 2009, she was announced to be a host of MBC music program, Show! Music Core with fellow member Tiffany. In April, K.Will released the music video of "Dropping The Tears", featuring Yuri. She then performed a special stage with him for one of his performances of the song on Show! Music Core, playing the piano in the background. At the end of the year, Yuri was cast alongside Sunny as one of the 7 girl group members, dubbed as 'G7' in the KBS2 reality variety show, Invincible Youth, for which she earned a nomination as Best Female MC at the 2010 KBS Entertainment Awards.

As Girls' Generation started preparing for their Japanese debut, their schedules became busier. Because of this, Yuri and Sunny left Invincible Youth in June 2010. For the same reason, she and Tiffany also had to leave Show Music Core in the following month to focus on the group's activities.

Yuri made her first contribution as a songwriter for Girls' Generation's third mini album, Hoot, where she wrote the lyrics for the track, "Mistake". In September, she was featured in the track "Like A Soap," from TVXQ's sixth Korean studio album Catch Me.

=== 2011–2014: Acting career ===
In October 2011, Tiffany and Yuri returned to Show! Music Core and hosted the show until January 2012 when Yuri left the show once again to focus on her drama debut.

In 2012, Yuri made her acting debut in SBS drama series Fashion King alongside actor Yoo Ah-in. Yuri received nominations at the 5th Korea Drama Awards and the 2012 SBS Drama Awards for her acting performance, and received the New Star Award at the latter on December 31.

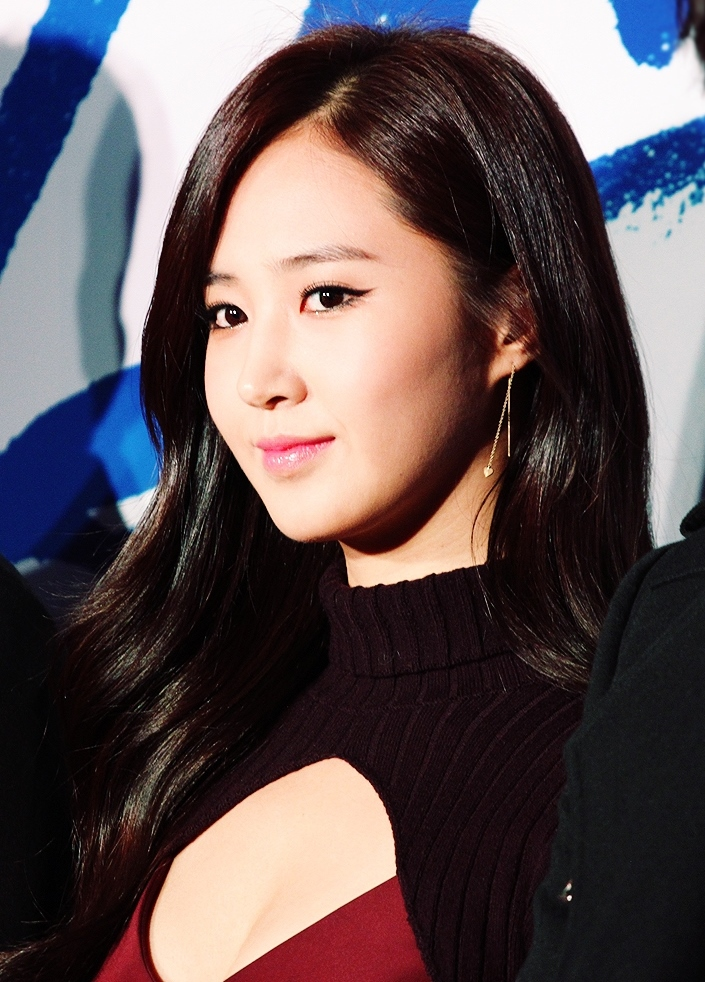
Yuri at VIP premiere of the film No Breathing in October 2013

In 2013, Girls' Generation released their fourth Korean studio album, I Got a Boy, which has two of its tracks' lyrics co-written by Yuri. "Baby Maybe" was co-written by Yuri and her fellow members Sooyoung and Seohyun, while "XYZ" was penned with Seohyun. In June, she appeared alongside Hyoyeon in Mnet's global dance survival show, Dancing 9. The two coached the show's contestants as "K-pop dance masters" along with other notable stars who also appeared as dance masters in their specific fields.

Yuri made her film debut in the same year, when she was cast as the female lead in South Korea's first swimming-themed film, No Breathing. In the coming-of-age film, Yuri portrayed the role of Jung-eun, a girl who dreams of becoming a musician who is also the love interest of the two male leads played by Lee Jong-suk and Seo In-guk. Aside from learning how to play the guitar for her character, Yuri also sang two songs for the film's soundtrack, "Bling Star" and "Twinkle Twinkle" which she performed in the film.

In October 2014, she acted as a couple with Lee Ji-hoon in the music video of "Without You" by S, which is the group's comeback single after 11 years.

=== 2015–2017: Variety shows and return to acting ===
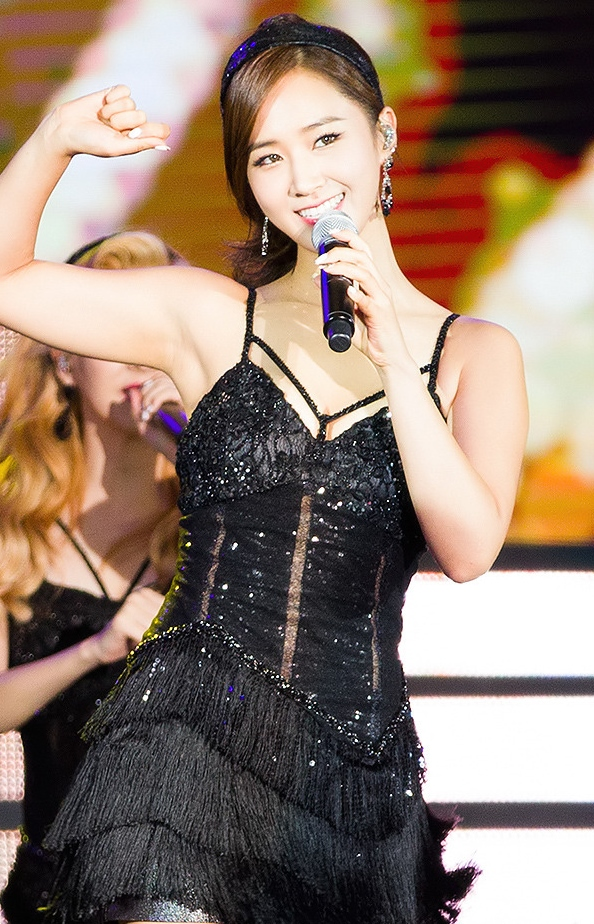
Yuri performing at the DMC Festival in September 2015.

In January 2015, Yuri joined MBC's variety show, Animals, becoming the only female member of the cast. Yuri was also a guest on the programs Star With Two Job and Dating Alone. In May, Yuri was chosen to host Olive TV's travel program MAPS with Choi Kang-hee. She also joined the cast of Our Neighborhood Arts and Physical Education for its swimming special, showing off her swimming skills for the first time. On July 23, it was revealed that Yuri was cast as a host in an SBS reality show about rally drivers called The Rallyist alongside announcer Bae Sung-jae.

Yuri returned to acting in January 2016, playing the female lead in the OCN spy thriller, Local Hero. She also joined the new cast of SBS' reality-documentary show Law of the Jungle for its new season which was filmed in New Caledonia. The first episode of the show aired on July 2, 2016. In July 2016, Yuri starred as the female lead alongside Kim Young-kwang in the web drama Gogh, The Starry Night In August 2016, Yuri released a single titled "Secret" with fellow member Seohyun as part of SM Station.

In January 2017, she starred in the SBS' drama Innocent Defendant and played a lawyer for which she was nominated for an Excellence Award in the Actress in a Monday-Tuesday Drama category at the 2017 SBS Drama Awards.

=== 2018–present: Acting activities and solo debut with The First Scene ===
In 2018, Yuri was cast in the second season of the sitcom, The Sound of Your Heart as the female lead, which premiered its first season on Netflix on October 29. In January, she released a collaboration single titled "Always Find You" with DJ Raiden. She was also cast in MBC's upcoming drama Dae Jang Geum Is Watching, which premiered in October.

In August 2018, Yuri was announced to be part of Girls' Generation's second sub-group, Oh!GG, which consisted of the five members who remained under SM Entertainment; the group released their first single, "Lil' Touch", in September.

Yuri released her six-track debut EP, The First Scene, on October 4, 2018, with the lead single "Into You". The album debuted at number two on the Gaon Album Chart and charted at number 10 on Billboard's World Albums chart in its first week with only one day to garner points to enter it. Yuri performed "Into You" on South Korea's music shows and her promotions for the album allowed her to top the Brand Reputation rankings for individual girl group members published by the Korean Corporate Reputation Research Institute for the month of October.

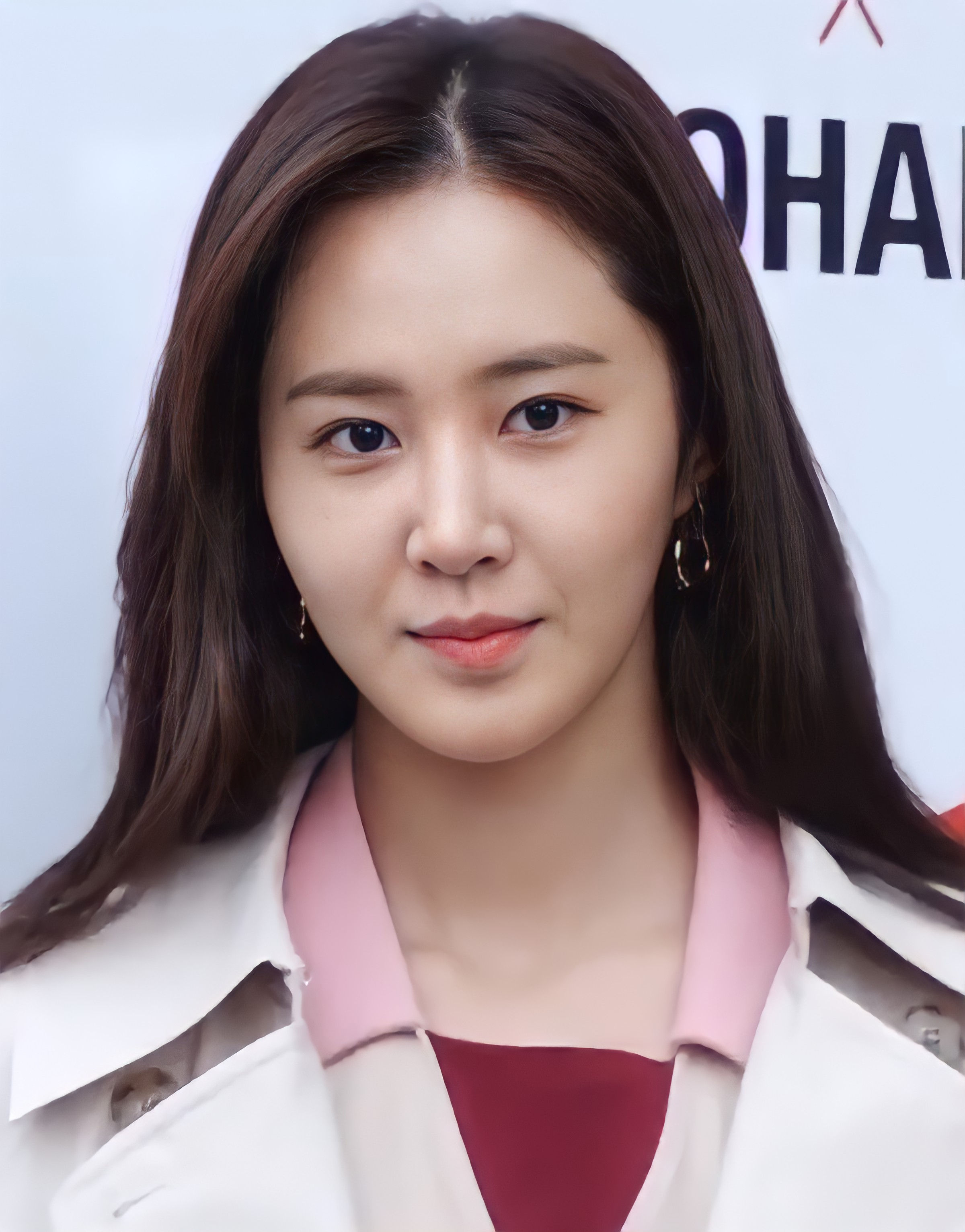
Yuri at a fashion event in 2019

Starting in November, Yuri appeared in the Channel A variety show, Makgeolli on the Rooftop, during which she and other celebrities learned how to brew makgeolli, a traditional Korean rice wine. In January 2019, she was cast in her first stage play, Grandpa Henry and Me ("L'Étudiante et Monsieur Henri"), which is a Korean version of the 2012 French play by Ivan Calbérac.

On August 26, 2020, Yuri joined Bossam: Steal the Fate as the female lead. The drama ended by recording an average viewership of 9.8% nationwide in its last episode, therefore becoming MBN's highest viewership rating for a drama in history.

On May 1, 2021, Hyoyeon and Yuri make an appearance on tvN's Amazing Saturday.

In September 2021, Kwon was confirmed to join the independent film Dolphin, making a comeback to the big screen since 2015. Her performance in this film earned her a Best New Actress nomination at the 45th Blue Dragon Film Awards.

On December 12, 2023 the production team of the movie Somebody announced the cast lineup including Kwak Sun Young, Girls' Generation's Yuri, Lee Seol, Ki So You, and more. On May 14, 2024 the movie was showcased at the 2024 Cannes Film Festival Market. Somebody, produced by Studio Santa Clause Entertainment was released in 2024.

On January 13, 2026 it was confirmed that Yuri will return to the theater after six years with the psychological thriller play The Wasp.

In July 2026, SM Entertainment announced that Yuri's exclusive contract with the agency would end on August 31. The agency stated that she would remain a member of Girls' Generation.

== Personal life ==
On March 21, 2023, it was revealed that Kwon had undergone varicose vein surgery. On July 26, 2025, Kwon completed her first class as a yoga instructor; a special session of "donation yoga" held to support stray dogs.

== Discography ==
=== Extended plays ===
List of extended plays, showing selected details, chart positions and sales
Title	Details	Peak chart positions		Sales
Title	Details	KOR	US World	Sales
The First Scene	Released: October 4, 2018; Label: SM Entertainment; Formats: CD, digital download	2	10	KOR: 17,290

=== Singles ===
List of singles, showing year released, selected chart positions and album name
Title	Year	Peak positions		Sales	Album
Title	Year	KOR	US World	Sales	Album
As lead artist
"Always Find You" (with Raiden)	2018	—	—	—N/a	SM Station Season 2
"Into You" (빠져가)	2018	— (Note: "Into You" did not enter the Gaon Digital Chart, but peaked at number 52 on the Gaon Mobile Chart.)	22	—N/a	The First Scene
Promotional singles
"Secret" (with Seohyun)	2016	149	10	KOR: 11,481	SM Station Season 1
Soundtrack appearances
"Kkok" (꼭) (with Sooyoung)	2008	—	—	—N/a	Working Mom OST
"Bling Star" (블링스타) (with Masyta Band)	2013	—	—	—N/a	No Breathing OST
"Twinkle Twinkle" (반짝반짝) (with Masyta Band)	2013	—	—	—N/a	No Breathing OST
"Time of the Time" (이별 유예)	2021	—	—	—N/a	A Week Delay of Farewell OST
"—" denotes songs that did not chart.

=== Songwriting credits ===
All song credits are adapted from the Korea Music Copyright Association's database unless stated otherwise.

Year	Album	Song	Lyrics		Music	
Year	Album	Song	Credited	With	Credited	With
2010	Hoot	"Mistake"	Yes	—N/a	No	—N/a
2013	I Got a Boy	"Baby Maybe"	Yes	Sooyoung, Seohyun	No	—N/a
2013	I Got a Boy	"XYZ"	Yes	Seohyun	No	—N/a
2017	Holiday Night	"It's You"	Yes	—N/a	No	—N/a

== Theater ==
Theater play performances of Kwon Yu-ri
Year	Title		Role	Venue	Date	Ref.
Year	English	Korean	Role	Venue	Date	Ref.
2019	The Student and Monsieur Henri	앙리할아버지와 나	Constance Piponnier	Daehangno Uniplex 1	March 15 to May 12	
2020	The Student and Monsieur Henri	앙리할아버지와 나	Constance Piponnier	Sejong Korean Theater Yeoju	November 13 to 14	
2020–2021	The Student and Monsieur Henri	앙리할아버지와 나	Constance Piponnier	Yes24 Stage 1	December 3 to February 14	
2026	The Wasp	말벌	Clara	Sejong S Theater	March 8 to April 26	

== Ambassadorship ==
- Ambassador of Korean Liquor Festival (2019–2022)
- Ambassador for the Cultural Diplomacy Charity "Beautiful Mind" (2023–present)
- Public Relations Ambassador for the Jeju Special Self-Governing Province (2025–present)

== Awards and nominations ==
Name of the award ceremony, year presented, category, nominee of the award, and the result of the nomination
Award ceremony	Year	Category	Nominee / Work	Result	Ref.
APAN Star Awards	2022	Best Couple	Kwon Yu-ri (with Jung Il-woo); Bossam: Steal the Fate	Nominated	
APAN Star Awards	2022	Popularity Star Award, Actress	Bossam: Steal the Fate	Nominated	
Asia Artist Awards	2021	Best Acting	Kwon Yu-ri	Won	
Asia Artist Awards	2022	Best Achievement X HITO Communications	Kwon Yu-ri	Won	
Asia Artist Awards	2022	Best Actor Award	Kwon Yu-ri	Won	
Asia Artist Awards	2022	Asia Celebrity (Actor)	Kwon Yu-ri	Won	
Baeksang Arts Awards	2013	Most Popular Actress – TV	Fashion King	Won	
Baeksang Arts Awards	2014	Most Popular Actress – Film	No Breathing	Won	
Blue Dragon Film Awards	2024	Best New Actress	Dolphin	Nominated	
Blue Dragon Series Awards	2023	Best Female Entertainer	The Zone: Survival Mission	Nominated	
KBS Entertainment Awards	2010	Best Female MC	Invincible Youth	Nominated	
Korea Drama Awards	2012	Best New Actress	Fashion King	Nominated	
Korean Arts and Culture Awards	2020	New Media Category	Yuri's Winning Recipe	Won	
MBC Entertainment Awards	2011	MC Special Award	Show! Music Core (with Tiffany)	Won	
MBC Entertainment Awards	2018	Best Entertainer for Sitcoms	Dae Jang Geum Is Watching	Won	
MBC Entertainment Awards	2018	Best Couple	Kwon Yu-ri (with Shin Dong-wook) in Dae Jang Geum Is Watching	Nominated	
MBC Entertainment Awards	2018	Excellence in Music and Talk (Female)	Dae Jang Geum Is Watching	Nominated	
MBC Entertainment Awards	2021	Special Award (Note: with Kwon Yu-ri, Ock Joo-hyun, Aiki and Jeon So-yeon)	My Teenage Girl	Won	
Mnet 20's Choice Awards	2011	Hot Campus Girl	Kwon Yu-ri	Nominated	
SBS Drama Awards	2012	New Star Award	Fashion King	Won	
SBS Drama Awards	2017	Excellence Award, Actress in a Monday-Tuesday Drama	Innocent Defendant	Nominated	
