= Parole Examiner Lee =

2024 South Korean television series

- Promotional poster
- Hangul: 가석방 심사관 이한신
- RR: Gaseokbang simsagwan I Hansin
- MR: Kasŏkpang simsagwan I Hansin
- Genre: Legal drama; Thriller
- Written by: Park Chi-hyung
- Directed by: Yoon Sang-ho
- Starring: Go Soo; Kwon Yu-ri; Baek Ji-won; Lee Hak-joo
- Music by: Park Se-jun
- Country of origin: South Korea
- Original language: Korean
- No. of episodes: 12

Production
- Running time: 60 minutes
- Production company: Kortop Media

Original release
- Network: tvN
- Release: November 18 – December 24, 2024

Parole Examiner Lee (Korean: 가석방 심사관 이한신) is a 2024 South Korean television series starring Go Soo, Kwon Yu-ri, Baek Ji-won, and Lee Hak-joo. It premiered on tvN on November 18, 2024 and aired every Monday and Tuesday at 20:50 (KST). It is also available for streaming on Viki in selected regions.

== Cast and characters ==
- Go Soo as Lee Han-shin

An ex-corrections officer who quits his initial job to become a lawyer and parole examiner to bring down the very person and organization who framed his senior officer and also those that bend the law with money.

- Kwon Yu-ri as Ahn Seo-yoon

A no-nonsense detective who has bad blood with Ojung Group after her sister was murdered by the chairman's son. Worked with Lee Han-sin to bring the entire organization down.

- Baek Ji-won as Choi Hwa-ran

A vicious but kind-hearted loanshark. Worked together with Lee Han-sin and Ahn Seo-yoon to bring down Ojung Group together with her know-how in the underworld after Lee Han-shin helped her with a case.

- Lee Hak-joo as Ji Myeong-seob

A second-generation chaebol of Ojung Group who is arrogant, rude and reckless. Accidentally killed Ahn Seo-yoon's younger sister thus invoking Ahn Seo-yoon to go after him and his father relentlessly.

- Song Young-chang as Ji Dong-man

Chaebol of Ojung Group and father of Ji Myeong-seob. Uses his wealth to bend the law to his will by bribing officials in high places to cover up his illegal dealings. Framed Lee Han-shin's senior corrections officer to be wrongfully imprisoned for a bogus drug charge which turned Lee Han-shin to go after him and his organization relentlessly.

- Hwang Woo-seul-hye as Choi Won-mi

An actress and ex-wife of Ji Dong-man. Often being threatened by Ji Dong-man and his son, would eventually find Lee Han-shin for assistance and also passing vital information that she held to Lee Han-shin and played a hand in bringing down Ojung Group.

- Hwang Young-hee as Lee Dong-myeong's mother

== Release ==
Parole Examiner Lee was confirmed to premiere on tvN on November 18, 2024, every Monday and Tuesday at 20:50 (KST). It is also available to stream on Viki in 190 countries.

== Viewership ==
Parole Examiner Lee : South Korea viewers per episode (thousands)

Season	Episode number												Average
Season	1	2	3	4	5	6	7	8	9	10	11	12	Average
1	945	1105	977	1318	1084	1118	1036	1103	1258	1292	1134	1281	1138

Source: Audience measurement performed nationwide by Nielsen Korea.

Average TV viewership ratings
Ep.	Original broadcast date	Average audience share (Nielsen Korea)	
Ep.	Original broadcast date	Nationwide	Seoul
1	November 18, 2024	4.596% (1st)	4.854% (1st)
2	November 19, 2024	5.352% (1st)	5.311% (1st)
3	November 25, 2024	4.682% (1st)	4.409% (1st)
4	November 26, 2024	6.257% (1st)	5.892% (1st)
5	December 2, 2024	5.102% (1st)	4.722% (1st)
6	December 3, 2024	5.552% (1st)	5.514% (1st)
7	December 9, 2024	4.838% (1st)	4.723% (1st)
8	December 10, 2024	5.258% (1st)	4.958% (1st)
9	December 16, 2024	6.104% (1st)	5.956% (1st)
10	December 17, 2024	6.513% (1st)	6.032% (1st)
11	December 23, 2024	5.694% (1st)	5.220% (1st)
12	December 24, 2024	5.836% (1st)	4.803% (1st)
Average		5.482%	5.200%
In the table above, the blue numbers represent the lowest ratings and the red numbers represent the highest ratings.; This drama airs on a cable channel/pay TV which normally has a relatively smaller audience compared to free-to-air TV/public broadcasters (KBS, SBS, MBC, and EBS).
