= Bossam: Steal the Fate =

2021 South Korean historical series

- Promotional poster
- Hangul: 보쌈–운명을 훔치다
- Hanja: 洑쌈–運命을 훔치다
- RR: Bossam–unmyeongeul humchida
- MR: Possam–unmyŏngŭl humch'ida
- Genre: Historical Drama; Romance
- Created by: Park Tae-ho (MBN); Kim Tae-hyun (Wavve)
- Written by: Kim Ji-su; Park Chul
- Directed by: Kwon Seok-jang
- Starring: Jung Il-woo; Kwon Yu-ri; Shin Hyun-soo; Kim Tae-woo
- Country of origin: South Korea
- Original language: Korean
- No. of episodes: 20

Production
- Executive producer: Kim Jae-hoon (MBN)
- Producers: Hong Hyuk; Lee Chang-gu; Kim Hyo-sung; Cha Do-ri
- Running time: 70 minutes
- Production companies: JS Pictures; EL Rise

Original release
- Network: MBN
- Release: May 1 – July 4, 2021

Bossam: Steal the Fate (Korean: 보쌈–운명을 훔치다) is a South Korean television series directed by Kwon Seok-jang and starring Jung Il-woo, Kwon Yu-ri, Shin Hyun-soo and Kim Tae-woo. Set in the Joseon period under Gwanghaegun, it depicts the change of fate of a bossam-man (Note: "Bossam" refers to a customary remarriage of the Joseon period. As a widow could not remarry in those days, a bachelor or widower kidnapped the widow and married her. Some of the kidnappings were mutually agreeable, but in some cases they were by force. This custom was known as bossam.) Ba-woo, when he mistakenly kidnaps the widowed daughter of the King. MBN's 10th anniversary special drama premiered on May 1, 2021, and aired every Saturday and Sunday from 21:40 (KST) till July 4, 2021. It is available for streaming on Wavve streaming media.

Bossam: Steal the Fate ended by recording an average viewership of 9.8% nationwide in its last episode, therefore becoming the highest-rated drama in the network's history, a record which was previously held by Graceful Family.

== Synopsis ==
Bossam was a custom in the Joseon period, in which a bachelor wrapped up a widow in a blanket at night and made her his wife.

This custom changes the fate of Ba-woo (Jung Il-woo), when he mistakenly kidnaps Yi Su-kyeong (Kwon Yu-ri), the king's widowed daughter. (Note: A woman who is unable to consummate the first night and her husband dies is referred to as a blue widow.)

== Cast ==
=== Main ===
- Jung Il-woo as Ba-woo/Kim Dae-seok; Kim Je-nam's grandson and Queen Dowager Soseong's nephew.
- Kwon Yu-ri as Yi Su-kyeong, Princess Hwain; the daughter of Gwanghaegun and Second Senior Consort Yun.
- Shin Hyun-soo as Yi Dae-yeob; Yi I-cheom's youngest son and Princess Hwain's brother-in-law.

=== Supporting ===
==== Royal Palace ====
- Kim Tae-woo as Gwanghaegun; the king and Princess Hwain's father.
- So Hee-jung as Second Senior Consort Yun; Princess Hwain's mother.
- Yang Hyun-min as Kim Ja-jeom
- Shin Dong-mi as Court Lady Jo; Princess Hwain's lady-in-waiting.
- Song Seon-mi as Court Lady Kim
- Seo Beom-sik as Jung-yeong; commander of the Royal Guard.

==== Yi Dae-yeob's Family ====
- Lee Jae-yong as Left State Councilor Yi I-cheom; Dae-yeop's father and Princess Hwain's father-in-law.
- Myung Se-bin as Madame Haeindang; Yi I-cheom's sister and Dae-yeob's aunt.
- Park Myung-shin as Lady Kim; Dae-yeop's mother and Princess Hwain's mother-in-law.
- Chu Yeon-gyu as Yi Won-yeob; Dae-yeop's eldest brother.

==== People around Ba-woo ====
- Lee Joon-hyuk as Chun-bae
- Ko Dong-ha as Cha-dol; Ba-woo's son.
- Jung Kyung-soon as Lady Jeong; Ba-woo's mother.
- Kim Joo-young as Kim Yeon-ok; Ba-woo's younger sister.

=== Others ===
- Yoon Joo-man as Dae-chul; Yi I-cheom's personal guard.
- Yoo Soon-woong as a monk
- Hong Jae-min as Hyeon-su
- Kim Seo-an as Princess Jeongmyeong
- Yoon Young-min as Queen Dowager Soseong
- Lee Min-jae as Prince Neungyang

=== Special appearances ===
- Ra Mi-ran as a bossam widow
- Kim Sa-kwon as groom of the bossam widow
- Jang Young-hyeon as a Sungkyunkwan scholar

== Production ==
=== Casting ===
On June 29, 2020 Jung Il-woo was confirmed to play the lead role. On August 26, 2020 Kwon Yu-ri joined the cast as the female lead. On 11 November, Shin Hyun-soo's agency reported that he was considering a proposal to appear in the new historical drama. In March 2021, the lineup was confirmed.

=== Filming ===
On November 23, 2020, it was reported that filming was stopped due to COVID-19 pandemic. An official from production of the drama quoted, "The filming was stopped due to the occurrence of a confirmed case. All the cast and staff are in self-quarantine."

=== Release ===
MBN's first historical series, the 10th anniversary special drama premiered on MBN on May 1, 2021, and streamed simultaneously on Wavve.

== Original soundtrack ==
Bossam: Steal the Fate

Soundtrack album by Various
- Released: 2021
- Genre: Soundtrack
- Languages: Korean; English
- Label: Danal Entertainment

=== Part 1 ===
Released on May 1, 2021
No.	Title	Lyrics	Music	Artist	Length
1.	"Just one day" (타이틀 단 하루만)	Kang Hee-chan, Jung Jae-woo	Kang Hee-chan, Jung Jae-woo	Lee Sojung (Ladies' Code)	4:37
2.	"Just one day" (Inst.)		Kang Hee-chan, Jung Jae-woo		4:37

=== Part 2 ===
Released on May 3, 2021
No.	Title	Lyrics	Music	Artist	Length
1.	"Love Song" (연가)	Kang Hee-chan, Jung Jae-woo	Kang Hee-chan, Jung Jae-woo	Jung-in	4:20
2.	"Love Song" (Inst.)		Kang Hee-chan, Jung Jae-woo		4:20

=== Part 3 ===
Released on May 8, 2021
No.	Title	Lyrics	Music	Artist	Length
1.	"Song Of Destiny"	Kang Hee-chan	Kang Hee-chan	HANYE	5:28
2.	"Song Of Destiny" (Inst.)		Kang Hee-chan		5:28

=== Part 4 ===
Released on May 10, 2021
No.	Title	Lyrics	Music	Artist	Length
1.	"Angular stones" (모난 돌멩이)	Kang Hee-chan, Jung Jae-woo	Kang Hee-chan, Jung Jae-woo	Jeong Hong-il	4:03
2.	"Angular stones" (Inst.)		Kang Hee-chan, Jung Jae-woo		4:03

=== Part 5 ===
Released on May 15, 2021
No.	Title	Lyrics	Music	Artist	Length
1.	"Along The Trail" (오솔길 따라)	Kang Hee-chan	Kang Hee-chan	Yeong Eun	4:19
2.	"Along The Trail" (Inst.)		Kang Hee-chan		4:19

=== Part 6 ===
Released on May 17, 2021
No.	Title	Lyrics	Music	Artist	Length
1.	"Bauga" (바우가)	Kang Hee-chan, Jung Jae-woo	Kang Hee-chan, Jung Jae-woo	Aeri Hwang	4:13
2.	"Bauga" (Inst.)		Kang Hee-chan, Jung Jae-woo		4:13

=== Part 7 ===
Released on May 22, 2021
No.	Title	Lyrics	Music	Artist	Length
1.	"Collar" (옷깃)	Jongsoo Lee, Whale Coffee House	Jongsoo Lee, Whale Coffee House	Sunny (Girls' Generation)	4:08
2.	"Collar" (Inst.)				4:08

=== Part 8 ===
Released on May 24, 2021
No.	Title	Lyrics	Music	Artist	Length
1.	"Long Long Night" (긴긴밤)	Heechan Kang	Heechan Kang	Mine	4:24
2.	"Long Long Night" (Inst.)				4:24

=== Part 9 ===
Released on May 29, 2021
No.	Title	Lyrics	Music	Artist	Length
1.	"Very Beautiful (with Ju-Pacific)" (가히 아름답다 (with 유태평양))	Minok Jung	Jongsoo Lee	Goonia	3:55
2.	"Very Beautiful" (Inst.)				3:55

=== Part 10 ===
Released on May 31, 2021
No.	Title	Lyrics	Music	Artist	Length
1.	"The Stars Are Falling" (별이 진다)	Kang Hee-Chan, Jung Jae-Woo	Kang Hee-Chan, Jung Jae-Woo	Susan	4:41
2.	"The Stars Are Falling" (Inst.)				4:41

=== Part 11 ===
Released on June 5, 2021
No.	Title	Lyrics	Music	Artist	Length
1.	"Up (String Ver.)" (위로 (String Ver.))	Jongsoo Lee, Whale Cafe	Jongsoo Lee, Whale Cafe	Yuju (GFriend)	3:48
2.	"Up" (위로)	Jongsoo Lee, Whale Cafe	Jongsoo Lee, Whale Cafe	Yuju (GFriend)
3.	"Back (String Ver.)" (Inst.)		Jongsoo Lee, Whale Cafe	Yuju (GFriend)
4.	"Back" (Inst.)		Jongsoo Lee, Whale Cafe

=== Part 12 ===
Released on June 7, 2021
No.	Title	Lyrics	Music	Artist	Length
1.	"Blossom" (꽃다비)	Heechan Kang	Heechan Kang	Sage	3:51
2.	"Blossom (LP Ver.)" (꽃다비 (LP Ver.))	Heechan Kang	Heechan Kang	Sage	3:51
3.	"Blossom" (Inst.)		Heechan Kang	Sage
4.	"Blossom (LP Ver.)" (Inst.)		Heechan Kang

=== Part 13 ===
Released on June 12, 2021
No.	Title	Lyrics	Music	Artist	Length
1.	"Rough Years" (거친 세월아 (박주한))	Lee Jong- soo, Landscape	Lee Jong- soo, Landscape	Park Joo-han	4:21
2.	"Rough Years" (Inst.)				4:21

=== Part 14 ===
Released on June 14, 2021
No.	Title	Lyrics	Music	Artist	Length
1.	"You Tell Me" (그대 내게 말해요)	Horseback Brother	Horseback Brother	Gloria Sim	3:28
2.	"You Tell Me" (Inst.)				3:28

=== Part 15 ===
Released on June 19, 2021
No.	Title	Lyrics	Music	Artist	Length
1.	"Black (with vivid slow)" (Black (with 비비드슬로우))	Kang Hee-chan, Jung Jae-woo	Kang Hee-chan, Jung Jae-woo	H3ATHR SUN	4:54
2.	"Black (with vivid slow)" (Inst.)				4:54

=== Part 16 ===
Released on June 21, 2021
No.	Title	Lyrics	Music	Artist	Length
1.	"Spring Wind Spring" (봄바람 봄)	Lee Jong-soo, Landscape	Lee Jong-soo, Landscape	Song Yu-jin	3:05
2.	"Spring Wind Spring" (Inst.)				3:05

=== Part 17 ===
Released on June 26, 2021
No.	Title	Lyrics	Music	Artist	Length
1.	"Flower"	Kang Hee-chan	Kang Hee-chan, Jung Jae-woo	Fla4free	3:54
2.	"Flower" (Inst.)				3:54

=== Part 18 ===
Released on June 28, 2021
No.	Title	Lyrics	Music	Artist	Length
1.	"Song of Dawn"	Kang Hee-chan	Kang Hee-chan, Jung Jae-woo	Grace Kim	6:09
2.	"Song of Dawn" (Inst.)				6:09

=== Part 19 ===
Released on July 3, 2021
No.	Title	Lyrics	Music	Artist	Length
1.	"Because I'm Waiting for You" (널 기다리니까)	Jongsu Lee, Landscape	Jongsu Lee, Landscape	Hanarumi	3:37
2.	"Because I'm Waiting for You" (Inst.)				3:37

=== Part 20 ===
Released on July 5, 2021
No.	Title	Lyrics	Music	Artist	Length
1.	"I'll Protect You" (지켜줄게요)	Talking Brother	Jongsu Lee, Seongwoo Yang	Nam Seungmin	4:01
2.	"I'll Protect You" (Inst.)				4:01

== Reception ==
=== Commercial performance ===
On its first episode, Bossam Steal Fate set a new viewership rating record for an MBN drama premiere.

As per Nielsen Korea, the 11th episode aired on June 5, 2021, logged a national average viewership of 8% with 1.61 million viewers, thereby breaking its own highest ratings.

According to Nielsen Korea, the 20th episode of Bossam: Steal the Fate, aired on July 4, scored an average nationwide rating of 9.8% with a peak of 11.2%, and has set a new record for the highest viewership ever achieved by any drama in MBN's history.

=== Audience viewership ===
Bossam: Steal the Fate : South Korea viewers per episode (millions)

Season	Episode number																				Average
Season	1	2	3	4	5	6	7	8	9	10	11	12	13	14	15	16	17	18	19	20	Average
1	0.609	0.583	0.933	1.138	1.231	1.295	1.143	1.549	1.304	1.344	1.618	1.562	1.752	1.643	1.748	1.693	1.887	1.580	1.864	1.940	1.4013

Source: Audience measurement performed nationwide by Nielsen Korea

Average TV viewership ratings
Ep.	Part	Original broadcast date	Average audience share (Nielsen Korea)	
Ep.	Part	Original broadcast date	Nationwide	Seoul
1	1	May 1, 2021	2.498% (NR)	N/A
1	2	May 1, 2021	3.132% (7th)	2.830% (6th)
2	1	May 2, 2021	2.020% (NR)	N/A
2	2	May 2, 2021	2.960% (6th)	2.362% (8th)
3	1	May 8, 2021	2.804% (10th)	2.967% (7th)
3	2	May 8, 2021	4.648% (1st)	4.239% (2nd)
4	1	May 9, 2021	3.809% (4th)	3.193% (5th)
4	2	May 9, 2021	5.511% (1st)	4.645% (2nd)
5	1	May 15, 2021	4.146% (6th)	3.862% (6th)
5	2	May 15, 2021	6.301% (1st)	5.974% (1st)
6	1	May 16, 2021	4.487% (3rd)	4.840% (3rd)
6	2	May 16, 2021	6.473% (2nd)	6.744% (2nd)
7	1	May 22, 2021	4.207% (3rd)	3.773% (5th)
7	2	May 22, 2021	5.756% (1st)	5.191% (1st)
8	1	May 23, 2021	5.113% (2nd)	4.832% (3rd)
8	2	May 23, 2021	7.667% (1st)	6.938% (1st)
9	1	May 29, 2021	5.466% (2nd)	4.638% (3rd)
9	2	May 29, 2021	6.875% (1st)	5.694% (1st)
10	1	May 30, 2021	5.271% (3rd)	4.151% (3rd)
10	2	May 30, 2021	6.940% (1st)	5.544% (2nd)
11	1	June 5, 2021	5.547% (3rd)	4.962% (4th)
11	2	June 5, 2021	7.957% (2nd)	7.100% (2nd)
12	1	June 6, 2021	5.327% (2nd)	4.309% (3rd)
12	2	June 6, 2021	7.073% (1st)	5.536% (1st)
13	1	June 12, 2021	5.979% (2nd)	4.952% (4th)
13	2	June 12, 2021	8.658% (1st)	7.447% (1st)
14	1	June 13, 2021	5.584% (2nd)	5.090% (3rd)
14	2	June 13, 2021	8.027% (1st)	7.177% (1st)
15	1	June 19, 2021	6.197% (2nd)	5.329% (3rd)
15	2	June 19, 2021	8.842% (1st)	8.123% (1st)
16	1	June 20, 2021	6.026% (3rd)	5.193% (4th)
16	2	June 20, 2021	8.440% (1st)	7.775% (1st)
17	1	June 26, 2021	6.323% (3rd)	5.602% (3rd)
17	2	June 26, 2021	8.959% (1st)	8.174% (1st)
18	1	June 27, 2021	5.688% (4th)	5.028% (5th)
18	2	June 27, 2021	7.697% (1st)	7.108% (1st)
19	1	July 3, 2021	7.007% (4th)	6.373% (4th)
19	2	July 3, 2021	9.363% (1st)	8.701% (1st)
20	1	July 4, 2021	7.143% (4th)	6.655% (4th)
20	2	July 4, 2021	9.759% (1st)	9.017% (2nd)
Average			6.042%	— (Note: Due to some unpublished ratings, the exact average rating is unknown.)
In the table above, the blue numbers represent the lowest published ratings and the red numbers represent the highest published ratings.; N/A denotes rating that was not released.; NR denotes that the episode did not rank in the top 20 daily programs on that date.; This series aired on a cable channel/pay TV which normally has a relatively smaller audience compared to free-to-air TV/public broadcasters (KBS, SBS, MBC and EBS).

== International broadcast ==
Recently, on the OTT platform Viki, which is being serviced in the Americas, the Middle East, Oceania and Asia, Bossam: Steal the Fate has risen to the Top 10 US Market Content ranking, as well as scored 9.4/10 in the service user evaluation. With the enthusiastic support of overseas fans, subtitles were created in 11 languages. In Taiwan, it's available for streaming on the popular platform friDay from May 1, 2021. The viewers rating is 4.8 out of 5. It is scheduled to be broadcast on GTV, one of Taiwan's four major broadcasters and KNTV, a Japanese broadcaster specialising in Korean wave, and will be serviced in the second half of this year on terrestrial broadcasters in Vietnam, the Philippines and Singapore. Also, it will replace Slay: Till Death Do Us Part on GMA at a later timeslot of 11:00 PM, after Saksi and before Desirable Flowers.

== Awards and nominations ==
Name of the award ceremony, year presented, category, nominee of the award, and the result of the nomination
Award ceremony	Year	Category	Nominee / Work	Result	Ref.
APAN Star Awards	2022	Best Couple Award	Jung Il-woo with Kwon Yu-ri	Nominated	
APAN Star Awards	2022	Popularity Star Award, Actor	Jung Il-woo	Nominated	
APAN Star Awards	2022	Popularity Star Award, Actress	Kwon Yu-ri	Nominated	
Asia Artist Awards	2021	Best Acting Award	Kwon Yu-ri	Won	
