= Tiffany Young discography =

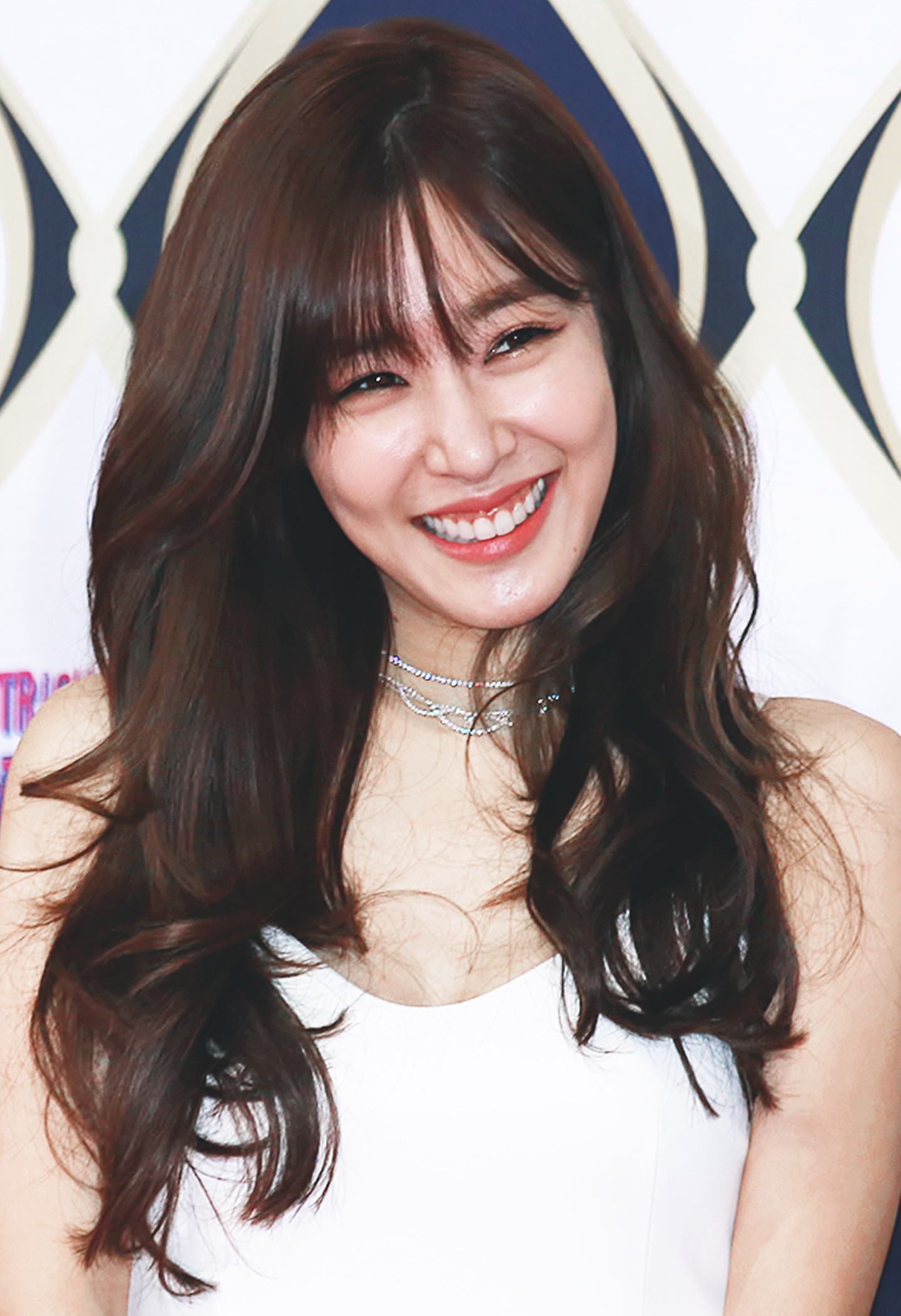
- Young at the 2016 KBS Entertainment Awards
- Studio albums: 1
- EPs: 2
- Singles: 11
- Promotional singles: 1
- Music videos: 12
- Soundtrack appearances: 12

The discography of American singer Tiffany Young consists of one studio album, two extended plays, eleven singles (including six as featured artist), and twelve soundtrack appearances. She debuted as a member of South Korean girl group Girls' Generation in August 2007 and has since achieved immense popularity on the Asian music scene. Tiffany is also a member of the Girls' Generation subgroup TTS and has recorded tracks for soundtracks for various television drama series and films.

Her career as a solo artist began in May 2016 with the release of her debut extended play I Just Wanna Dance. The EP peaked at number three on the Gaon Album Chart and has sold over 63,154 copies in South Korea. The title track, "I Just Wanna Dance", peaked at numbers ten and eight on the Gaon Digital Chart and the Billboard World Digital Songs, respectively. In June 2016, Tiffany released a song titled "Heartbreak Hotel", which was a promotional single for S.M. Entertainment's digital music platform SM Station.

Although she continues to be a member of Girls' Generation, Tiffany left S.M. Entertainment in October 2017 and moved back to Los Angeles to pursue a solo career. Following the release of four non-album singles in 2018, Tiffany released her second extended play, Lips on Lips, in February 2019, which was supported by the lead singles "Born Again" and "Lips on Lips."

== Studio albums ==
List of studio albums, showing selected details, selected chart positions, and sales figures
Title	Details	Peak chart positions	Sales
Title	Details	KOR	Sales
Edge of Calm	Released: August 20, 2026; Label: Pacific Music Group; Formats: CD, digital download, streaming	19	KOR: 6,199

== Extended plays ==
List of extended plays, showing selected details, selected chart positions, sales figures, and certification
Title	Details	Peak chart positions					Sales	Certifications
Title	Details	KOR	JPN	US Heat.	US Ind.	US World	Sales	Certifications
Korean
I Just Wanna Dance	Released: May 11, 2016; Label: SM Entertainment; Formats: CD, digital download, streaming audio	3	41	10	49	3	KOR: 66,549; JPN: 4,281	—N/a
English
Lips on Lips	Released: February 22, 2019; Label: Transparent Arts; Formats: CD, digital download, streaming audio	8	—	9	30	—	KOR: 11,371; US: 1,000	KOR: Platinum
"—" denotes releases that did not chart or were not released in that region.

== Singles ==
=== As lead artist ===
List of singles, with selected chart positions, showing year released and album name
Title	Year	Peak chart positions		Sales	Album
Title	Year	KOR	US World	Sales	Album
Korean
"I Just Wanna Dance"	2016	10	5	KOR: 183,799	I Just Wanna Dance
"Heartbreak Hotel" (featuring Simon Dominic) (Note: "Heartbreak Hotel" was released in conjunction with the promotion of S.M. Entertainment's digital music platform SM Station.)	2016	84	—	KOR: 43,427	SM Station Season 1
English
"Over My Skin"	2018	—	—	N/A	Non-album singles
"Teach You"	2018	—	—	N/A	Non-album singles
"Born Again"	2019	—	—	N/A	Lips on Lips
"Lips on Lips"	2019	—	—	N/A	Lips on Lips
"Runaway" (featuring Babyface)	2019	—	—	N/A	Lips on Lips
"Magnetic Moon"	2019	—	—	N/A	Non-album singles
"Run For Your Life"	2019	—	—	N/A	Non-album singles
"Summer's Not Over"	2026	—	—	KOR: 3,202 (Phy.)	Edge of Calm
"Edge of Calm"	2026	— (Note: "Edge of Calm" did not enter the Circle Digital Chart, but peaked at number 136 on the component Download Chart.)	—	N/A	Edge of Calm
"—" denotes a recording that did not chart or was not released in that territory.

=== Promotional singles ===
List of songs, showing year released and album name
Title	Year	Album
"Peppermint"	2018	N/A

=== Collaborations ===
Title	Year	Peak chart positions	Sales (DL)	Album
Title	Year	KOR	Sales (DL)	Album
"Love Hate" (with Jessica and Seohyun)	2008	*	—N/a	Non-album singles
"GMPer's Song" (with Jessica)	2008	—	—N/a	2008 GMP Song (Good Morning Pops)
"Picnic Song (with Jessica)	2008	—	—N/a	2008 GMP Song (Good Morning Pops)
"Mabinogi" (with Jessica and Seohyun)	2008	*	—N/a	Non-album singles
"Cabi Song" (with Taeyeon, Jessica, Sunny, Yuri, Seohyun, Chansung, Jun. K and Taecyeon)	2010	—	—N/a	Non-album singles
"You Are a Miracle" (with various artists)	2013	32	KOR: 53,496+	2013 SBS Gayo Daejun Friendship Project
"Talk About Love" (with various artists)	2014	—	—N/a	Non-album singles
"Shut Up" (as part of Unnies)	2016	3	KOR: 724,088+	Non-album singles
"—" denotes a recording that did not chart or was not released in that territory.

=== As featured artist ===
Title	Year	Peak chart positions	Sales (DL)	Album
Title	Year	KOR	Sales (DL)	Album
"The Secret" (Kim Dong-wan featuring Tiffany)	2008	*	—N/a	The Secret
"A Girl, Meets Love" (K.Will featuring Tiffany)	2009	*	—N/a	Dropping the Tears
"Feeling Only You" (The Blue featuring Tiffany and Sooyoung)	2009	*	—N/a	The First Memories
"QnA" (Han Hee-jun featuring Tiffany)	2015	158	—N/a	Non-album single
"Ruedy Boogie" (Truedy (트루디) featuring Tiffany)	2015	—	—N/a	Unpretty Rapstar 2
"Don't Speak" (Far East Movement featuring Tiffany and King Chain)	2016	—	—N/a	Identity
"—" denotes a recording that did not chart or was not released in that territory.

== Soundtrack appearances ==
Title	Year	Peak positions		Sales	Album (soundtrack)
Title	Year	KOR	KOR Hot	Sales	Album (soundtrack)
"Touch the Sky" (with Taeyeon, Jessica, Sunny and Seohyun)	2007	*	*	—N/a	Thirty Thousand Miles in Search of My Son
"The Little Boat" (with Taeyeon, Jessica, Sunny and Seohyun)	2008	*	*	—N/a	Hong Gildong
"By Myself"	2009	*	*	—N/a	Ja Myung Go
"Motion" (with Taeyeon, Jessica, Sunny and Seohyun)	2009	*	*	—N/a	Heading to the Ground
"Ring"	2010	26	*	—N/a	Haru
"Haechi" (with Taeyeon, Jessica, Sunny and Seohyun)	2010	—	*	—N/a	My Friend Haechi
"Because It's You"	2012	42	40	KOR: 95,908	Love Rain
"Rise and Shine" (with Kyuhyun)	2012	37	34	KOR: 140,294	To the Beautiful You
"One Step Closer"	2013	39	46	KOR: 100,049	All About My Romance
"Cheap Creeper" (with Taeyeon, Jessica, Sunny and Seohyun)	2014	—	*	—N/a	Make Your Move
"Good Life" (with Henry)	2014	—	*	—N/a	Final Recipe
"Only One"	2015	90	*	KOR: 18,141	Blood
"—" denotes a recording that did not chart or was not released in that territory.

== Other charted songs ==
Title	Year	Peak chart positions			Sales	Album
Title	Year	KOR	KOR Hot (Note: The Korea K-Pop Hot 100 chart was launched in 2011 by Billboard and was discontinued in 2014.)	US World	Sales	Album
"Talk to Me" (with Jessica)	2010	28	*	—	—N/a	Oh!
"Lost in Love" (with Taeyeon)	2013	30	45	—	KOR: 172,408	I Got a Boy
"Talk"	2016	79	*	—	KOR: 31,097	I Just Wanna Dance
"Fool"	2016	116	*	—	KOR: 21,604	I Just Wanna Dance
"What Do I Do"	2016	113	*	—	KOR: 22,337	I Just Wanna Dance
"Yellow Light"	2016	135	*	—	KOR: 19,865	I Just Wanna Dance
"Once in A Lifetime"	2016	126	*	—	KOR: 21,636	I Just Wanna Dance
"What Do I Do" (English version)	2016	—	*	14	—N/a	I Just Wanna Dance
"—" denotes a recording that did not chart or was not released in that territory.

== Music videos ==
Title	Year	Director
As lead artist
"I Just Wanna Dance"	2016	VM Project Architecture
"Heartbreak Hotel" (featuring Simon Dominic)	2016	Unknown
"Remember Me"	2018	Unknown
"Over My Skin"	2018	Proper Form
"Teach You"	2018	Beomjin J. of VM Project Architecture
"Born Again"	2019	Nikko Lamere
"Lips on Lips"	2019	Nikko Lamere
"Runaway (ft. Babyface, Chloe Flower)"	2019	Nikko Lamere & Transparent Arts
"Magnetic Moon"	2019	GDW
"Run For Your Life"	2019	
"Summer's Not Over"	2026	Itchcock (BTSFilm)
"Edge of Calm"	2026	
As featured artist
"Don't Speak" (Far East Movement featuring Tiffany and King Chain)	2016	Rigend Film

== See also ==
- Girls' Generation discography
- Girls' Generation-TTS discography
