= List of Tiffany Young live performances =

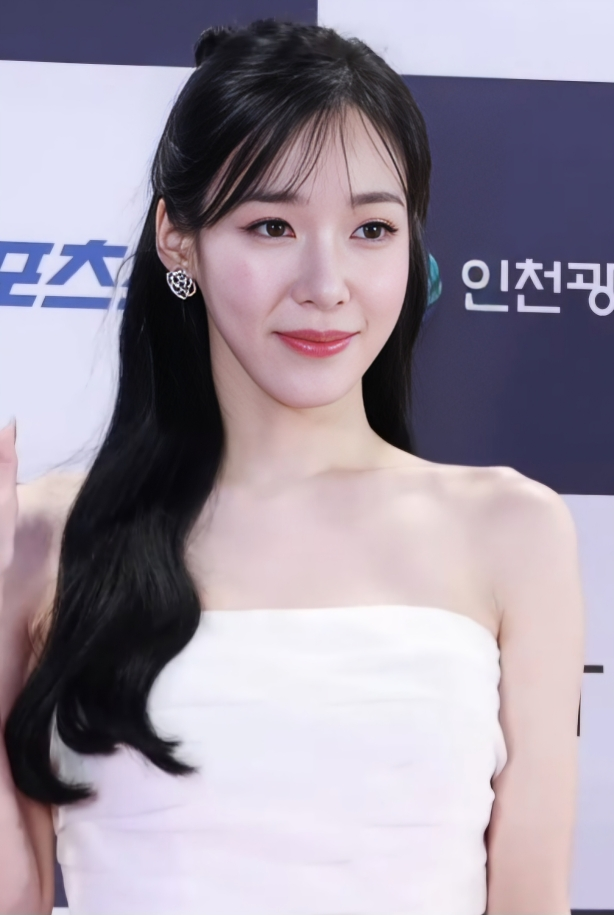
- Tiffany Young at the 3rd Blue Dragon Series Awards
- Music Festivals: 4
- Tours: 6

American singer-songwriter Tiffany Young has performed in multiple concerts and festivals since her debut as part of Girls' Generation in 2007. Her first solo concert was The Agit: Tiffany's Weekend, as part of SM Entertainment's The Agit concert series in 2016.

== Concert tours ==
=== The Agit: Tiffany's Weekend ===
Tour dates
Date	City	Country	Venue
June 10, 2016	Seoul	South Korea	SMTOWN Theatre
June 11, 2016	Seoul	South Korea	SMTOWN Theatre
June 12, 2016	Seoul	South Korea	SMTOWN Theatre
June 24, 2016	Seoul	South Korea	SMTOWN Theatre
June 25, 2016	Seoul	South Korea	SMTOWN Theatre
June 26, 2016	Seoul	South Korea	SMTOWN Theatre

=== Lips on Lips North American Mini Showcase Tour ===
Tour dates
Date	City	Country	Venue
North American
March 3, 2019	Toronto	Canada	Mod Club
March 6, 2019	New York City	United States	Bowery Ballroom
March 8, 2019	Chicago	United States	Lincoln Hall
March 9, 2019	Minneapolis	United States	Amsterdam Hall
March 12, 2019	Seattle	United States	The Crocodile
March 13, 2019	Vancouver	Canada	Venue
March 15, 2019	San Francisco	United States	Great American Music Hall
March 16, 2019	Los Angeles	United States	Troubadour
South Korea
March 26, 2019	Seoul	South Korea	Kaos Hall

=== Open Hearts Eve ===
Tour dates
Date	City	Country	Venue
August 8, 2019	Seoul	South Korea	Yes24 Live Hall
August 17, 2019	Bangkok	Thailand	Thunder Dome
January 19, 2020	Taipei	Taiwan	Taipei International Convention Center
January 23, 2020	Tokyo	Japan	Zepp Diver City Tokyo
January 25, 2020	Manila	Philippines	New Frontier Theater

=== Magnetic Moon North American Tour ===
Tour dates
Date	City	Country	Venue
October 25, 2019	San Francisco	United States	The Regency Ballroom
October 27, 2019	Vancouver	Canada	Vogue Theatre
October 28, 2019	Portland	United States	Wonder Ballroom
October 29, 2019	Seattle	United States	Showbox at The Market
November 1, 2019	Minneapolis	United States	First Avenue
November 2, 2019	Chicago	United States	Vic Theatre
November 4, 2019	Toronto	Canada	The Danforth Music Hall
November 6, 2019	Philadelphia	United States	Union Transfer
November 8, 2019	Boston	United States	Paradise Rock Club
November 9, 2019	Washington, D.C.	United States	U Street Music Hall
November 10, 2019	Brooklyn	United States	Brooklyn Steel
November 12, 2019	Raleigh	United States	Lincoln Theatre
November 13, 2019	Atlanta	United States	Buckhead Theatre
November 15, 2019	Houston	United States	White Oak Music Hall
November 16, 2019	Dallas	United States	Trees
November 18, 2019	Denver	United States	Bluebird Theater
November 20, 2019	Phoenix	United States	Crescent Ballroom
November 21, 2019	Los Angeles	United States	The Fonda Theatre

=== Here for You ===
Tour dates
Date	City	Country	Venue	Attendance
March 22, 2025	Ho Chi Minh City	Vietnam	Nguyen Du Gymnasium	4,000
April 12, 2025	Taipei	Taiwan	Taipei International Convention Center	3,000
April 19, 2025	Pak Kret	Thailand	Thunder Dome	
May 3, 2025	Seoul	South Korea	Myunghwa Live Hall	
July 27, 2025	Taguig	Philippines	Samsung Hall	

=== Edge of Calm Tour ===
Tour dates
Date	City	Country	Venue
September 12, 2026	Hong Kong	China	AXA Dreamland inside Go Park Sai Sha
September 19, 2026	Jakarta	Indonesia	Jakarta International Expo Theatre
September 26, 2026	Singapore		Arena @ Expo
October 10, 2026	Taipei	Taiwan	National Taiwan University Sports Center
October 11, 2026	Taipei	Taiwan	National Taiwan University Sports Center
October 17, 2026	Ho Chi Minh City	Vietnam	Nguyen Du Gymnasium
October 25, 2026	Bangkok	Thailand	UOB Live
December 27, 2026	Seoul	South Korea	Ewha Womans University Auditorium

== Joint concerts and music festivals ==
List of performances, showing dates, location, and relevant informations
Event	Dates	Venue	City	Country	Performed song(s)	Ref(s)
SM Town Live World Tour V	July 16 – 17, 2016	Kyocera Dome	Osaka	Japan	"I Just Wanna Dance"	
SM Town Live World Tour V	August 13 – 14, 2016	Tokyo Dome	Tokyo	Japan	"I Just Wanna Dance"	
Korea Times Music Festival	April 29, 2017	Hollywood Bowl	Los Angeles	United States	"I Just Wanna Dance" and "City of Stars"	
D23 Expo	August 25, 2019	Anaheim Convention Center	Anaheim	United States	"Born Again", "Runaway", "Can You Feel the Love Tonight", and "Magnetic Moon"	
Super K-Pop Festival	September 28, 2019	Indonesia Convention Exhibition	Tangerang Regency	Indonesia	"I Just Wanna Dance", "Don't Stop the Music", "Heartbreak Hotel", "Over My Skin", "Lips on Lips", "In My Blood, "Born Again", and "Magnetic Moon"	

== Television shows and specials ==
List of performances, showing dates, location, and relevant information
Event	Dates	Country	Performed song(s)	Ref(s)
M Countdown	May 12, 2016	South Korea	"Talk" and "I Just Wanna Dance"	
Music Bank	May 13, 2016	South Korea	"Once in a Lifetime" and "I Just Wanna Dance"	
Show! Music Core	May 14, 2016	South Korea	"What Do I Do" and "I Just Wanna Dance"	
Inkigayo	May 15, 2016	South Korea	"I Just Wanna Dance"	
The Show	May 17, 2016	South Korea	"I Just Wanna Dance"	
Show Champion	May 18, 2016	South Korea	"I Just Wanna Dance"	
M Countdown	May 19, 2016	South Korea	"I Just Wanna Dance"	
Music Bank	May 20, 2016	South Korea	"I Just Wanna Dance"	
Show! Music Core	May 21, 2016	South Korea	"I Just Wanna Dance"	
Inkigayo	May 22, 2016	South Korea	"I Just Wanna Dance"	
Saturday Night Live Korea	May 28, 2016	South Korea	"Talk" and "I Just Wanna Dance"	
Simply K-Pop	June 3, 2016	South Korea	"I Just Wanna Dance"	
Music Bank	June 3, 2016	South Korea	"I Just Wanna Dance"	
You Hee-yeol's Sketchbook	June 24, 2016	South Korea	"Heartbreak Hotel" and "I Just Wanna Dance"	
Good Day L.A.	August 21, 2018	United States	"Over My Skin"	
104.3 MY FM	August 21, 2018	United States	"Over My Skin" and "I Just Wanna Dance"	
MBC FM4U 91.9 Mhz FM	March 25, 2019	South Korea	"Lips on Lips" and "Born Again"	
LeeMujin Service	May 12, 2026	South Korea	"Summer's Not Over", "I Just Wanna Dance", "Running", and "Forever with You"	
