= Run for Your Life =

Run for Your Life, or variants, may refer to:

== Literature ==
- Run for Your Life (Line novel), a 1966 children's novel by Lionel Davidson
- Run for Your Life (Patterson novel), a 2009 novel by James Patterson and Michael Ledwidge

== Film and television ==
=== Film ===
- Run for Your Life (1988 film), an Italian-British film directed by Terence Young
- Run for Your Life (1997 film) (Swedish: Spring för livet), a Swedish film by Richard Hobert
- Run for Your Life, a 2008 American documentary directed by Judd Ehrlich
- Run for Your Life (2014 film), starring Amy Smart

=== TV ===
- The Big Knights: Run For Your Lives!, British animated television series The Big Knights (1999–2000)
- Run for Your Life (TV series), a 1960s US TV series
- "Run for Your Life", a 1993 episode of Highlander: The Series
- "Run for Your Lives!", episode 15 of Ovide and the Gang (1988)
- Salve-se Quem Puder, a 2020 Brazilian telenovela also known as Run for your lives

== Music ==
=== Albums ===
- Run for Your Life (The Creepshow album) or the title song, 2008
- Run for Your Life (Yellowjackets album), 1994
- Run for Your Life, by The Producers, 1985
- Run for Your Life, by Tarney/Spencer Band, 1979
- Run for Your Lives!, by Flight Distance, 2005

=== Songs ===
- "Run for Your Life" (Beatles song), 1965
- "Run for Your Life" (Bucks Fizz song), 1983
- "Run for Your Life" (The Fray song), 2012
- "Run for Your Life" (Måns Zelmerlöw song), 2014
- "Run for Your Life" (Matt Cardle song), 2011
- "Run for Your Life", by Eric Burdon from I Used to Be an Animal, 1988
- "Run for Your Life", by Freda Payne from Payne & Pleasure, 1974
- "Run for Your Life", by Impending Doom from The Sin and Doom Vol. II, 2018
- "Run for Your Life", by Kumi Koda, a B-side of the single "Freaky", 2007
- "Run for Your Life", by Loudness from Thunder in the East, 1985
- "Run for Your Life", by Northern Line, 1999
- "Run for Your Life", by Riot from Fire Down Under, 1981
- "Run for Your Life", by Riot from Thundersteel, 1988 (different song)
- "Run for Your Life", by Robert Randolph and the Family Band from Unclassified, 2003
- "Run for Your Life", by Runner, 1979
- "Run for Your Life", by Stratus, 1985
- "Run for Your Life", by Tiffany Young, 2019
- "Run for Your Life", by Twisted Sister from Under the Blade, 1982
- "Run for Your Life", composed by Jimmy Van Heusen and Sammy Cahn for the musical Skyscraper, 1965
- "Run for Your Lives", by Saxon from Crusader, 1984
- "Run for Your Lives", from the soundtrack Children of Earth, 2009
- "Spring för livet" (English: Run for Your Life), by Swedish singer Sara Varga, 2011

=== Concert tours ===
- Run For Your Lives World Tour, an upcoming concert tour by Iron Maiden

== Other uses ==
- Run for your lives, 2015 sculpture by Gillie and Marc
- Run for Your Lives (obstacle racing), an obstacle course adventure run in the United States

== See also ==
- Run for Your Wife (disambiguation)
