= Run for Your Wife =

Run for Your Wife may refer to:

- Run for Your Wife (play), a 1983 play by Ray Cooney
- Run for Your Wife (Modern Family), a 2009 episode of the TV series Modern Family
- Run for Your Wife (1965 film), a 1965 Italian comedy
- Run for Your Wife (2012 film), a UK-made 2012 film, based on the theatre farce Run For Your Wife

== See also ==
- Run for Your Life (disambiguation)
