= Edge of Calm =

- Digital cover

Studio album by Tiffany Young
- Released: August 20, 2026
- Genres: R&B; soul
- Length: 32:08
- Languages: English; Korean
- Labels: Pacific Music Group; Dreamus

Tiffany Young chronology
Lips on Lips (2019)	Edge of Calm (2026)

Singles from Edge of Calm
- 1. "Summer's Not Over" Released: May 8, 2026; 2. "Edge of Calm" Released: August 20, 2026

Edge of Calm is the first studio album by American singer Tiffany Young. It was released by Pacific Music Group and Dreamus on August 20, 2026. The album marks the 10th anniversary of her solo debut project and her first music release since her 2019 EP, Lips on Lips.

== Background and release ==
In April 2026, Tiffany Young signed a contract with South Korean record label Pacific Music Group. Later that month, Young announced the release of her first single in seven years, "Summers Not Over", which was released on May 8, 2026.

On July 14, 2026, Young announced that her debut album, Edge of Calm, would be released on August 20, 2026. The album contains eleven tracks and features collaborations with Miyeon and Junny. The album was released alongside a music video for its title track. An accompanying Asia tour was also announced, beginning on September 12 in Hong Kong and concluding on December 27 in Seoul.

== Track listing ==
Credits adapted from Apple Music

Edge of Calm track listing
No.	Title	Lyrics	Music	Arrangement	Length
1.	"Codes"	Nathan Fertig; Ally Salort; Matthew Hall	Nathan Fertig; Ally Salort; Matthew Hall	Tiggs	2:45
2.	"Drip Drop"	Gino Barletta; Alina Smith	Gino Barletta; Alina Smith; KZ; Kim Tae-young	KZ; Kim Tae-young	3:17
3.	"Halfway Honest"	Thomas Crimeni; Nicholas Persiani	Thomas Crimeni; Nicholas Persiani; TMM	T9C; Moblord	3:16
4.	"Moment"	Chloe Martini; Rachael Chevlin	Chloe Martini; Rachael Chevlin; Adam Świerczyński; Adam Kiepuszewski; Tamuz Dolev	Chloe Martini	3:45
5.	"Come Call Me Yours"	Harry Charles; Shy Martin; Sarah Troy	Harry Charles; Shy Martin; Sarah Troy	Harry Charles	3:06
6.	"Edge of Calm"	Thomas Crimeni; Nicholas Persiani	Thomas Crimeni; Nicholas Persiani; TMM	T9C; Moblord	2:44
7.	"Lips Together" (featuring Miyeon)	Matias Mora; Kella Armitage; Sophie Simmons; Rory Adams	Matias Mora; Kella Armitage; Sophie Simmons; Rory Adams	Matias Mora	2:23
8.	"Lovers" (featuring Junny)	Lleucu Young; Louise Udin; Jonathan Lavotha	Lleucu Young; Louise Udin; Jonathan Lavotha	Jonathan Lavotha	2:30
9.	"Summer's Not Over" (Korean version)	Jo Yoon-kyung	JOA; Laurent Marc Louis; Olivia Escuyos; R.L. King	Laurent Marc Louis; Vince Evans; LAINE; Shane Jarvie-Kohn; Cahill Kelly; Andrew Braidner	2:37
10.	"Summer's Not Over"	JOA; Laurent Marc Louis; Olivia Escuyos; R.L. King	JOA; Laurent Marc Louis; Olivia Escuyos; R.L. King	Laurent Marc Louis; Vince Evans; LAINE; Shane Jarvie-Kohn; Cahill Kelly; Andrew Braidner	2:37
11.	"Moonlit Rain"	Tiffany Young; Louise Udin; Max Thulin; Maia Wright	Louise Udin; Max Thulin; Maia Wright	Max Thulin	3:08
Total length:					32:08

== Charts ==
=== Weekly charts ===
Weekly chart performance for Edge of Calm
Chart (2026)	Peak position
South Korean Albums (Circle)	19

=== Monthly charts ===
Monthly chart performance for Edge of Calm
Chart (2026)	Peak position
South Korean Albums (Circle)	84

== Release history ==
Release history for Edge of Calm
Region	Date	Format	Label
South Korea	August 20, 2026	CD	Pacific Music Group; Dreamus
Various	August 20, 2026	Digital download; streaming	Pacific Music Group; Dreamus
