= Kim Na-young (television personality) =

South Korean television personality (born 1981)

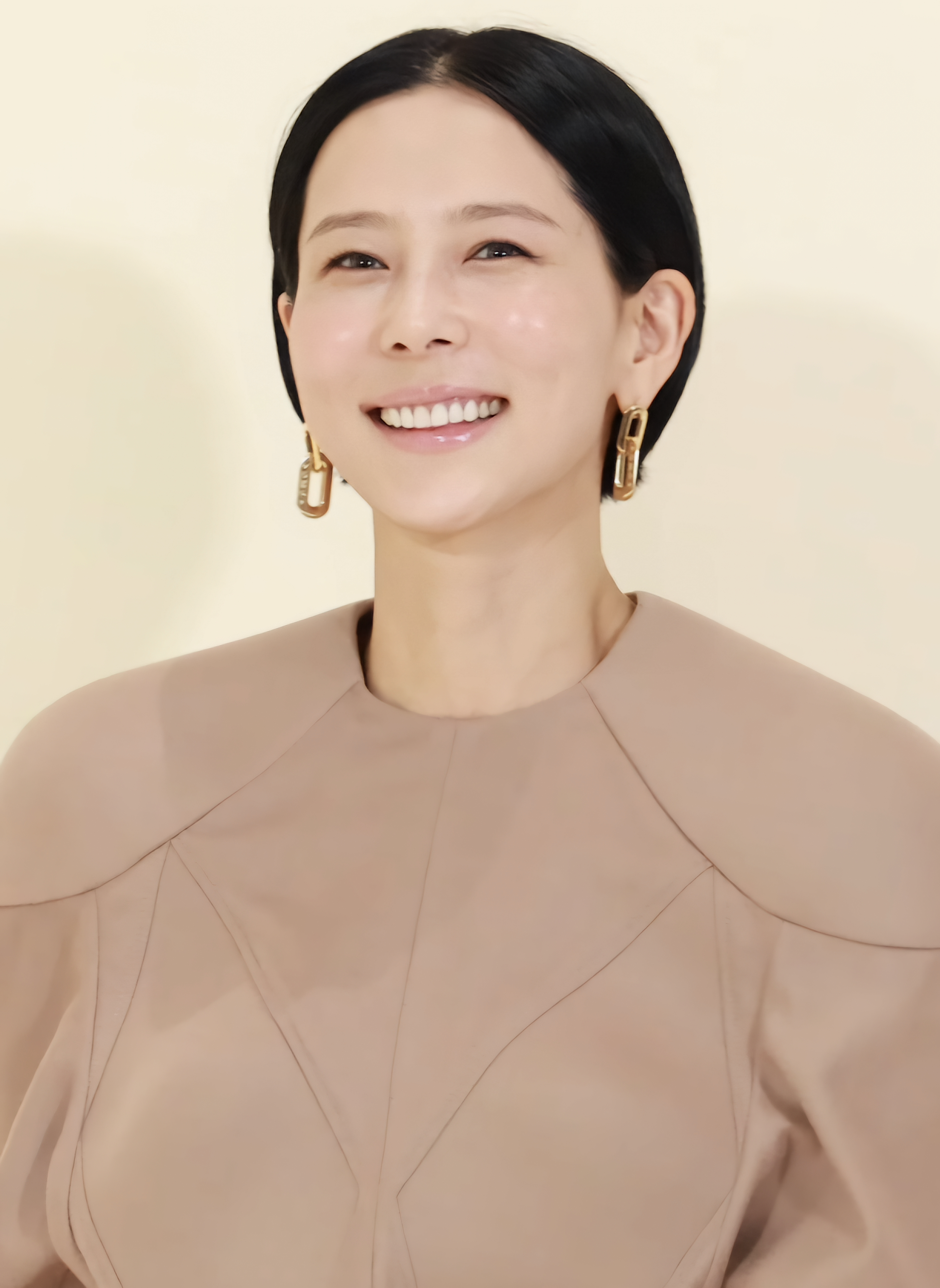
- Kim in July 2024
- Born: October 8, 1981 (age 44); Chuncheon, South Korea
- Occupation: Television personality
- Years active: 2003–present
- Spouses: Unknown (m. 2015; div. 2019); My Q (m. 2025)
- Children: 2

Korean name
- Hangul: 김나영
- Hanja: 金娜怜
- RR: Gim Nayeong
- MR: Kim Nayŏng
- Website: Kim Na-young on Instagram

Kim Na-young (Korean: 김나영; born October 8, 1981) is a South Korean television personality, comedian, and Paris street fashion model. She was a cast member in the variety show We Got Married.

== Personal life ==
On April 27, 2015, Kim married her non-celebrity fiancé in a private ceremony on Jeju Island. However, her husband was arrested in November 2018 for allegedly violating the law on capital market and financial investment. He allegedly pocketed about 22.3 billion won ($19.69 million) from 1,063 victims while running an unauthorized futures investment company. In January 2019 few months after the arrest of her husband, Kim Na-young announced on her YouTube channel that she would split from her husband. She had two children from her arrested husband.

On December 16, 2021, it was reported that Kim had a relationship with painter My Q, with the two developing their relationship since November 2021. The couple married on October 3, 2025.

== Fashion career ==
Belgium's famous street style website, STYLE DU MONDE had been featuring Na-young's street fashion photos since 2013 in their website.

== Philanthropy ==
On June 13, 2022, Kim donated 100 million won from Kim's YouTube income, to be given to a single female family through the Beautiful Foundation.

On December 11, 2022, Kim will donate proceeds from filming to her YouTube channel, to help single mothers.

== Filmography ==
=== Television shows ===
Year	Title	Note
2009	We Got Married	with Lee Seok-hoon
2011	We Got Married	Guest Commentator
2012	English King Korea	Contestant (winner)
2012	English King Korea	with "Jake" Lee, Geun-Chul, Canadian Kelly Frances (official mentors)
2013	Vitamin	Fixed panelist
2013	Fashion King Korea	Contestant (winner)
2014	Kim Nayoung's 10,000 Like	Host
2017	Battle Trip	Contestant with Lee Hyun-yi (episodes 56–57)
2017	King of Mask Singer	Contestant as "Vivien Leigh" (Episode 127)
2019	Stars' Top Recipe at Fun-Staurant	Cast/chef (episodes 1–7)
2021	Honki Club	Cast Member
2021–2022	Magic Wardrobe	Host; Season 1–2
2021	Bride X Club	manager
2022	Dads from across the water	Host
2025	Closet Battle	Co-host
