= Fashion King Korea =

2013 South Korean television series

- Hangul: 패션왕 코리아
- RR: Paesyeonwang Koria
- MR: P'aesyŏnwang K'oria
- Country of origin: South Korea
- Original language: Korean
- No. of seasons: 2
- No. of episodes: 10

Production
- Producer: Ahn Sang-nam

Original release
- Network: SBS
- Release: November 17, 2013

Fashion King Korea (Korean: 패션왕 코리아) is a South Korean celebrity fashion survival program by SBS.

Eight celebrities will team up with the nation's top designers to compete with each other in fashion challenges and missions. Each week, the team with the lowest score will be eliminated. The competition will be screened by 100 fashion specialists.

The show began filming on October 2, 2013, and premiered on November 17, 2013.

== Season 1 ==
In the first season, the eight celebrities that participated in the show are Girls' Generation's Tiffany, SISTAR's Bora, Yoon Gun, Lee Ji-hoon, Kim Na-young, Boom, Lim Dong-wook and Cho Mi-rim.

The fashion designers were Park Yoon-jung, Lee Joo-young, Jung Doo-young, Ji Il-keun, Lee Ji-eun, Jang Hyung-chul, Nam Yoon-jae and Kim Hong-bum.

=== Teams ===
Celebrity	Designer
Tiffany	Ji Il-keun
Bora	Lee Joo-young
Boom	Park Yoon-jung
Yoon Gun	Lee Ji-eun
Kim Na-young	Jung Doo-young
Lee Ji-hoon	Kim Hong-bum
Cho Mi-rim	Nam Yoon-jae
Lim Dong-wook	Jang Hyung-chul

On February 2, 2014, Kim Na-young and her partner Jung Doo-young were declared the winners.

== Season 2 ==
The show was renewed for a second season and the first episode aired on August 16, 2014, with Shin Dong-yup as the host.

The celebrities participating in the second season are Jung Joon-young, Clara, Block B's Zico, P.O, Sunmi, ZE:A's Kwanghee, Yoon Jin-seo, Jo Se-ho and Hong Jin-kyung.

The designers that team up with the celebrities are Go Tae-yong, Choi Bum-suk, Han Sang-hyuk, Logan, Song Hye-myung, Kwak Hyun-joo, and Yang Hee-min.

=== Teams ===
Celebrity	Designer
Clara	Choi Bum-suk
Jung Joon-young	Han Sang-hyuk
Kwanghee	Kwak Hyun-joo
Sunmi	Yang Hee-min
Jo Se-ho and Hong Jinkyung	Song Hye-myung
Zico and P.O	Go Taeyong
Yoon Jin-seo	Logan
