= Run for Your Lives (obstacle racing) =

3–5K obstacle course adventure run

Run For Your Lives
- Genre: Adventure Race, Concept Runs
- Frequency: Recurring
- Locations: United States, Europe, Asia, Australia
- Website: runforyourlives.co

Run For Your Lives (RFYL) is a 3-5K obstacle course adventure run series created by Maryland-based Reed Street Productions (RSP). Like other obstacle races, runners navigate through various terrain and physically challenging obstacles. Unlike other obstacle races, runners try to dodge and escape from zombies roaming the course trying to grab flags from runners' flagbelts, similar to flag football. The course was designed to incorporate zombies as well as SERE training learned by a RSP managing-member who is active-duty navy. The inaugural race had about 12,000 attendees and was covered by multiple news sources.

The event is billed as training for when the real zombie apocalypse comes. During and after the race, people attend the Apocalypse Party which has live music, beer, food, vendors, and games. Each participant is individually timed and broken into 9 competitive age divisions. Costumes, team uniforms, and zombie make-up are highly encouraged at the event and add to the lighthearted atmosphere.

On October 31, 2013, Colorado-based Human Movement Management (HMM) took control of the Run For Your Lives Zombie 5k and will be continuing with the rest of the 2013 and 2014 races.

Run For Your Lives Asia (RFYLA) originated from the US event and is wholly owned and managed by Action X, an independent Singapore based event production company. The first Asian leg took place in Singapore on January 11, 2014 right in the heart of the city at Marina Bay to resounding success. Nearly 10,000 participants took part in the event, from 3 in the afternoon until 11 at night. The Asian franchise has been rebranded to drop the word Asia and instead list the country's name after the parent brand.

== Development ==
Reed Street Productions, the creators of Run For Your Lives, was formed in 2011. The initial purpose of the race was to have a small event to help improve awareness of the sponsor Warwear. However, the race gathered a lot of interest helping RSP to expand the event and eventually take it to other cities in 2012. The first RFYL event was held at Camp Ramblewood near Baltimore, MD on October 22, 2011. Over 10,000 runners registered.

== The Race ==
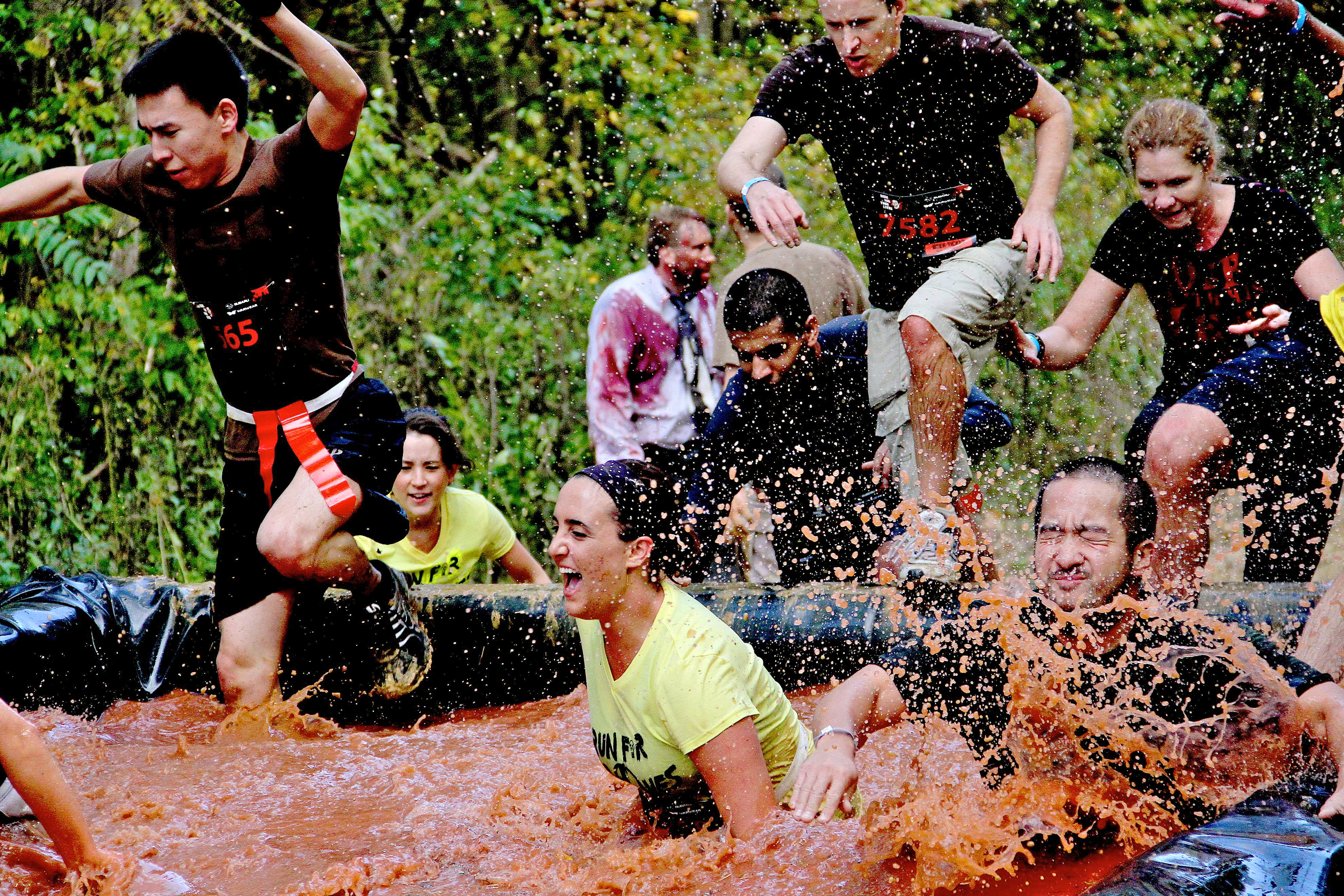

=== Course ===
RFYL courses are typically 5K in length, although each course varies by location and trail layout. Trails are mostly through wooded areas with some open fields and water barriers depending on location. Each race has around 12 man-made and natural obstacles that runners must overcome. The creators of the race do not reveal the obstacles as to keep the course a secret, but obstacles typically involve climbing, sliding, crawling, dodging, and sometimes swimming.

RFYL courses also have multiple paths to the finish line. The Run For Your Lives website states, "There will be a start line, and a finish line, but what happens in between is up to you." Some routes are dead ends, and others may take longer or have more zombies in the area. There are also health packs on the course which runners can find to ensure their survival at the finish line.

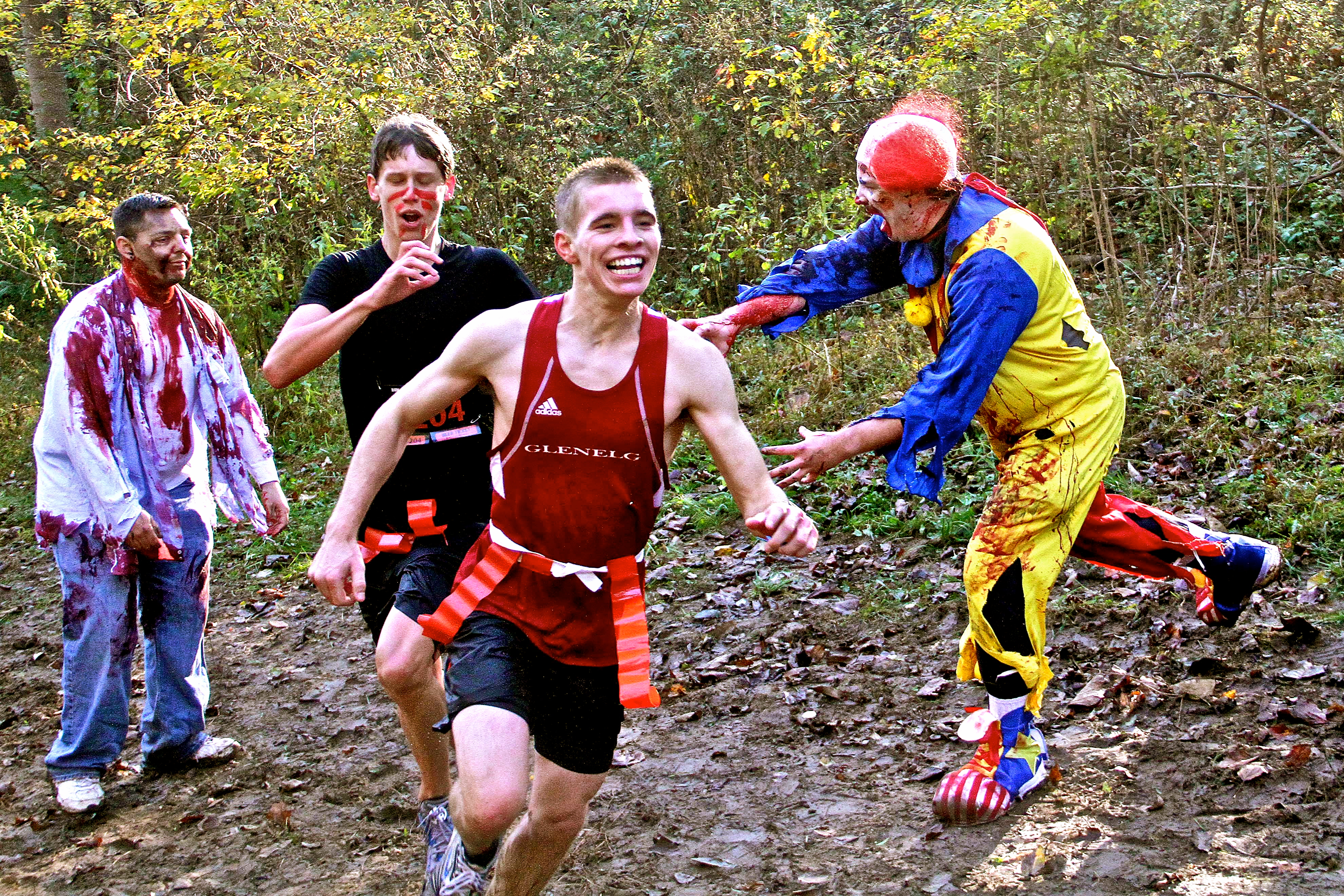

=== Zombies ===
Anyone can sign up to be a zombie. Each zombie is professionally made-up and are not supplied with wardrobe, although costumes brought are zombified. Zombies chase after runners and try to grab flags off of runners' flagbelts. The creators of the race do not release how many zombies are on the course to keep the course a secret.

=== Determining locations ===
Each location is near a major city. Also, a lot of space is needed for the course. At least 150 acres.

== Apocalypse Party ==
During and after the race, participants and spectators attend the Apocalypse Party. Multiple food and beer vendors are at the event as well as zombie-themed merchandise sellers, and contests and entertainment. At some events, local celebrities have made appearances, such as IronE Singleton, "T-Dog" from AMC's The Walking Dead and Sal and Richard from the Howard Stern Show.

== Charity partnerships ==
=== Kennedy Krieger Institute ===
The Kennedy Krieger Institute is a national charitable partner of Run For Your Lives for 2013. A portion of every ticket sold at each race is donated to the Kennedy Krieger Institute to help diagnose and treat children and adolescents with disorders of the brain, spinal cord, and musculoskeletal system.

=== Project Sole ===
In 2012, Run For Your Lives established a partnership with Project Sole, a non-profit organization that collects shoes to raise money for domestic schools and civic organizations while distributing footwear to impoverished and disaster stricken communities throughout the world. At each event, Run For Your Lives participants have the option to donate their used sneakers after the race.

== Event calendar ==
=== 2011 ===
State	Location	Date
Maryland	Camp Ramblewood	October 22, 2011

=== 2012 ===
State	Location	Date
Georgia	Durhamtown Plantation Sports Complex	March 3, 2012
Massachusetts	Amesbury Sports Park	May 5, 2012
Minnesota	Spring Creek Motorcross	June 2, 2012
Indiana	Boondocks Farms	June 23, 2012
Colorado	Thunder Valley Motorcross	July 14, 2012
Washington	Burntridge MX Park	August 4, 2012
Missouri	Wright City	August 18, 2012
Pennsylvania	Switchback Raceway	September 1, 2012
Toronto	Burls Creek Family Event Park	September 22, 2012
California	Vail Lake Village	October 20, 2012
Maryland	Camp Ramblewood	October 27 and 28, 2012
Florida	Revolution Off Road	November 17, 2012
Texas	Big Longhorn Ranch	December 15, 2012

=== 2013 ===
State	Location	Date
South Florida	Miami	April 27, 2013
California	Clearlake Oaks	May 11, 2013
Ohio	South Logan	May 25, 2013
Texas: DFW	South Forney	June 1, 2013
New Jersey	Medford	June 8, 2013
Indiana	Knightstown	June 22, 2013
Colorado	Byers	June 29, 2013
Minnesota	Millville	July 13, 2013
Pennsylvania	Wampum	August 3, 2013
New York	Batavia	August 17, 2013
Washington	McCleary	August 24, 2013
new-hampshire	Candia	September 7, 2013
Georgia	Dalton	September 14, 2013
Illinois	Byron	September 21, 2013
California	San Bernardino	September 28, 2013
maryland	Charlotte Hall, MD	October 5, 2013
Missouri	Wright City	October 12, 2013
brooklyn-nyc	Brooklyn	October 26, 2013
Arizona	Sacaton	November 2, 2013
Austin	Cedar Creek	December 7, 2013

=== 2014 ===
City	Location	Date
Singapore	Marina Bay	January 11, 2014
Hong Kong	West Kowloon Waterfront Promenade	October 2, 2014
Singapore	West Coast Park	October 25, 2014
Malaysia	Malaysia Agro Exposition Park Serdang	December 13, 2014

=== 2015 ===
City	Location	Date
Shanghai	Wei Cheng Guo Fang School, Songjiang	July 19, 2015
Shenzhen	Shenzhen Universiade Center	September 5, 2015
Australia	Western Sydney Parklands	September 5, 2015
Guangzhou	South China Botanical Garden	December 12, 2015
Indonesia	Taman Impian Jaya Ancol Jakarta	December 12, 2015

=== 2016 ===
City	Location	Date
Shanghai	Shanghai Expo Park	October 22, 2016
Shenzhen	Shenzhen Central Park	November 11, 2016
Kuala Lumpur	Taman Botani Negara	December 31, 2016

=== 2017 ===
City	Location	Date
Guangzhou/Foshan	Baobao Farm	January 1–2, 2017

== Race cessation and new management ==
On October 30, 2013, registered participants for upcoming races received an email from Run For Your Lives stating in part, "It is with great sadness that we are notifying you that the Run For Your Lives event you have purchased a ticket for has been canceled ... all events are postponed indefinitely and you should contact your bank for a full refund."

The sole global rights partner of Run For Your Lives (RFYL) subsequently took the brand from USA to Asia Pacific, from Australia to through China. Upon the complete dissolution of RSP in December 2013, Action X rightfully gain ownership of RFYL around the world.

== Asian market ==
Recognizing the opportunity in Asia, Arthur Lin, co-founder of Action X, made contact with Reed Street Productions to bring the event over to the Far East. With Singapore in mind as the first stop, Action X was founded on May 10, 2013 to organise Run For Your Lives events all throughout Asia. A franchise model was adopted with Action X given full rights to organise the runs in several Asian countries. The event was thus branded as Run For Your Lives Asia with the intention to bring the event, billed as the original zombie-infested obstacle run, to countries such as Taiwan, Thailand, Hong Kong, Japan, China, Australia and several others in 2014 and 2015. With the insolvency of Reed Street Productions, Action X now wholly owns the right to conduct the event in Asia and the world.
