= Born Again (Tiffany Young song) =

Single by Tiffany Young

from the album Lips on Lips
- Released: January 24, 2019
- Length: 3:12
- Label: Transparent Arts
- Songwriter(s): Tiffany Young; Satica; fiction; Fernando Garibay; Miro

Tiffany Young singles chronology
"Peppermint" (2018)	"Born Again" (2019)	"Lips on Lips" (2019)

Music video
- "Born Again" on YouTube

"Born Again" is a song recorded by American singer Tiffany Young. It was released on January 24, 2019, by Transparent Arts as a digital single. On February 22, it was added to the EP Lips on Lips as the main single. "Born Again" was produced by Fernando Garibay (who worked with stars such as Lady Gaga and Britney Spears).

== Background and release ==
After winning stardom as a Girls' Generation's member, Tiffany embarked on her solo career in the United States. After starting with the singles "Over My Skin" and "Teach You" and releasing a Christmas song titled "Peppermint", Tiffany released "Born Again" on January 25, 2019.

== Composition ==
The song was written by Tiffany Young, Satica, fiction, Fernando Garibay and Miro. It was produced by Garibay. Lyrically the song talks about Young looking for a new beginning.

== Music video ==
The video clip was recorded near an ocean. The emotional intensity of the video is palpable, especially in the scenes where Tiffany is sobbing sitting in the sand. The video obtained 2 million views in its first week of release.
