= Lips on Lips =

EP by Tiffany Young
- Released: February 22, 2019
- Genre: Pop
- Length: 22:40
- Language: English
- Label: Transparent Arts
- Producers: Kevin Nishimura (exec.); Fernando Garibay; MIRO; DNNYD; 9AM; August Rigo; The Rascals

Tiffany Young chronology
I Just Wanna Dance (2016)	Lips on Lips (2019)	Edge of Calm (2026)

Singles from Lips on Lips
- 1. "Born Again" Released: January 25, 2019; 2. "Lips on Lips" Released: February 14, 2019; 3. "Runaway" Released: May 31, 2019

Lips on Lips is the second extended play by American singer Tiffany Young. The EP was released on February 22, 2019, by Transparent Arts and consists of five tracks including the title tracks, "Born Again" and "Lips on Lips".

== Background and release ==
In October 2017, after her contract with SM Entertainment ended, she signed with Paradigm Talent Agency. In that year, Tiffany released several songs as a soloist, and on January 25, 2019, she released "Born Again" and on the same day, it was announced that it would be part of the EP, Lips on Lips.

Lips on Lips was released on February 22 on various music platforms, such as iTunes, Spotify, Apple Music and others. On the day of the album's release, Tiffany did a V Live broadcast, where she told fans about the new album and performed several songs.

== Track listing ==
No.	Title	Lyrics	Music	Length
1.	"Born Again"	Tiffany Young; Satica; Fiction	MIRO; DNNYD; Fernando Garibay	3:13
2.	"Lips on Lips"	Young; Satica; Kev Nish	9AM	3:44
3.	"The Flower"	Young; Satica; Varren Wade	9AM	3:01
4.	"Not Barbie"	Young; Satica; Ginette Claudette; Nish; Ricky Tillo	August Rigo	3:24
5.	"Runaway" (featuring Babyface)	Babyface	The Rascals	3:46
Total length:				16:28

Bonus Tracks
No.	Title	Lyrics	Music	Length
6.	"Teach You"	Young; Satica; Kev Nish; Rachel West; Allie McDonald	Mike Derenzo; AObeats	3:06
7.	"Over My Skin"	Young; Kev Nish; Rachel West	Far East Movement; Khwezi	2:56
Total length:				22:40

== Promotion ==
She promoted the EP through her Lips on Lips Mini Showcase Tour, which spanned eight dates around North America in March 2019.

== Charts ==
Chart (2019)	Peak position
South Korean Albums (Gaon)	8
US Heatseekers Albums (Billboard)	9
US Independent Albums (Billboard)	30

== Sales ==
Region	Certification	Certified units/sales
South Korea	—	10,564
