= I Just Wanna Dance =

EP by Tiffany
- Released: May 11, 2016
- Genre: Synthpop
- Length: 23:50
- Languages: Korean; English
- Labels: S.M. Entertainment; KT Music
- Producer: Lee Soo-man (exec.)

Tiffany chronology
I Just Wanna Dance (2016)	Lips on Lips (2019)

Singles from I Just Wanna Dance
- 1. "I Just Wanna Dance" Released: May 12, 2016

I Just Wanna Dance is the debut extended play by American singer Tiffany Young. It was released by S.M. Entertainment on May 11, 2016. Lee Soo-man, former president of S.M. Entertainment, served as executive producer on the EP. The EP marked the official solo debut of Tiffany after having been known as a member of South Korean girl group Girls' Generation for nearly nine years. Musically, the record is a primarily synthpop album with elements of trap and R&B that draws heavy influence from American female artists of the 1990s.

Tiffany promoted the EP in South Korea by holding a debut showcase at SMTown COEX Artium in Seoul on May 10, 2016 and through a six-leg concert titled Weekend-Tiffany in June 2016. She also appeared on several music shows including M Countdown and Show Champion. The title track "I Just Wanna Dance" was released as the lead single from the EP. Upon its release, I Just Wanna Dance received generally favorable reviews from music critics, who praised Tiffany's vocals while comparing its styles to those of works by Carly Rae Jepsen, Ariana Grande and Mariah Carey. The EP was also well received commercially, peaking at numbers three on South Korea's Gaon Album Chart and US Billboard World Albums Chart.

== Background and development ==
"I’m making music with a strong conviction. If you pay too much attention to rankings, you don’t do music that contains your color; you only do music that satisfies the public’s taste."

— Tiffany discussing the album's music styles

Since 2007, South Korea-based American singer Stephanie Young Hwang (better known by her stage name Tiffany) has been known to be a member of the popular girl group Girls' Generation. During the early part of her career, her solo work mostly involved songs recorded for side projects and original soundtracks. In May 2016, Tiffany became the second Girls' Generation member, after fellow member Taeyeon, to officially debut as a solo artist, releasing her debut album, titled I Just Wanna Dance.

Tiffany began working on her solo record during the summer of 2015, having the mindset of it being the "transition into the next chapter of [her] music career." She recalled having long meetings with her label, S.M. Entertainment, to figure out the music concepts for the project. Her label initially expected Tiffany to put together an album that reflects a bubbly image. However, the singer had a different idea, stating that she wanted "something much more chill". According to Tiffany, the "real exciting part" for her being a solo artist is the ability to decide her own new "sound" and "message", while still being a part of Girls' Generation.

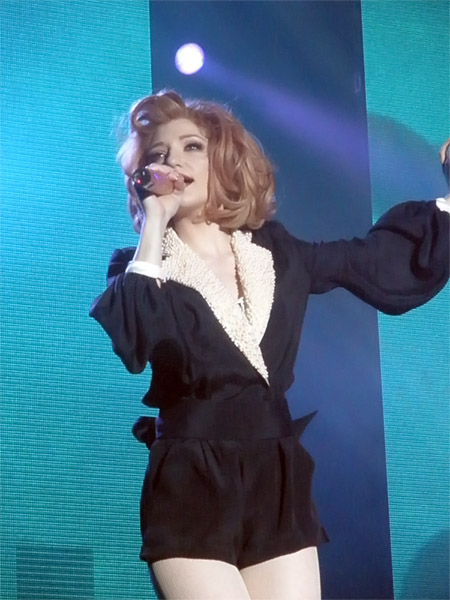
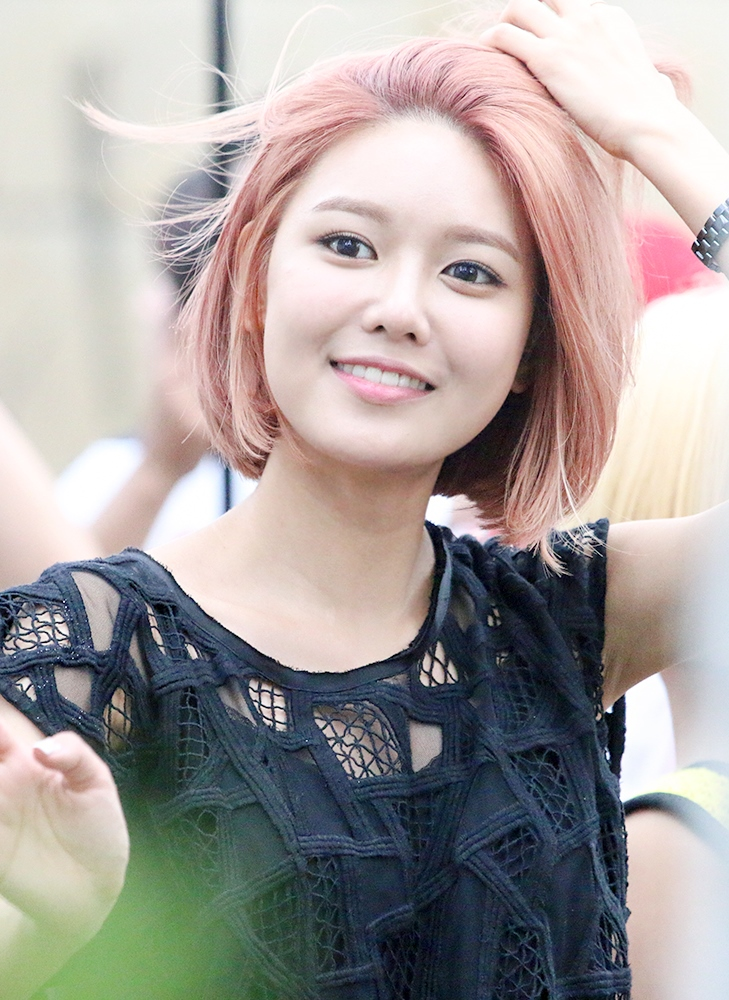
Nicola Roberts of British girl group Girls Aloud (left) co-wrote "Talk", while Tiffany's bandmate Sooyoung from Girls' Generation (right) co-wrote the Korean version of "What Do I Do".

Heavily influenced by the American female artists of the 90's, Tiffany has described the album to embrace a throw-back American pop sound. She further described it as having "chill" and "natural" vibes and cited the most difficult part in putting the album together was her efforts in "work[ing] out of [her] comfort zone" and "learning how to push limits". She credited her 9-year experience being a member of girl group Girls' Generation as the force that helped making it easier for her to transition into a solo artist. She also hailed Girls' Generation member Taeyeon as "a big part" who had supported her throughout the entire process of the album preparation.

Speaking of her titular title track, Tiffany expressed "Most girls my age, when they are stressed or want to kind of get away, they dance the night away. I think it should be everybody's theme song." Since 2014, Tiffany started writing music, calling it "nerve-wrecking [sic] to put out music [she’s] written on [her] own." One of her songs, "What Do I Do", made it to the final track list. Although Tiffany participated in both music writing and English lyrics for the track, Girls' Generation member Sooyoung helped write the Korean lyrics. Tiffany also named "Talk" as her favorite track of the album, recalling she was having a "fan girl moment" after finding out its music was written by Girls Aloud's Nicola Roberts.

Known to be taking part in the artwork and visuals for previous Girls’ Generation and TTS's releases, Tiffany purposely avoided it and only wanted to focus on the music for her solo album. She, however, took a directorial role for her follow-up single "Heartbreak Hotel". The track, featuring Simon Dominic, was supposed to be a part of the album, but was pushed back and released under the SM Station digital music platform in June 2016. She explained the song was meant to be a prequel to "I Just Wanna Dance", where the woman goes through the "falling for the bad boy" stage; being heartbroken, she forgets about her stress and dances the night away.

"When I do create a performance or video, it’s not just going to be about a lot of pretty outfits and lights, a lot of teenage stuff; it’s going to have a lot more emotions and depth…I hope that I can be that type of artist…where I will put out something very honest or raw and someone else will be able to feel through that. Whether that’s something sad or something happy."

== Composition ==
"I Just Wanna Dance"
"I Just Wanna Dance" is an electronica song backed by "icy" 1980s synthesizers and features vocals that recall Carly Rae Jepsen, Ariana Grande, and Mariah Carey.

I Just Wanna Dance is a synthpop record that draws inspiration from American retro musical styles of the 1990s with a "modern take." The EP was noted for its American influence: Chester Chin from The Star wrote that the EP's "sonic DNA bears closer resemblance" to the likes of Carly Rae Jepsen and Selena Gomez. Most tracks are incorporated with synthesizers that gives a "cool" feel of the 1980s and the 1990s.

The opening track "I Just Wanna Dance" is an electronica song that is backed by "icy" 1980s synthesizers. Entertainment Weekly's Joey Nolfi described the track as "bubbly electronic dance" that "recall works by Mariah Carey, Robyn, and Gwen Stefani." Jeff Benjamin writing for Fuse compared Tiffany's "more sensual" vocals on the song to those of Carly Rae Jepsen and Ariana Grande while likened her "powerhouse" notes in the second chorus and the bridge to Mariah Carey's famous whistle register. "Talk" is a trap-influenced song instrumented by synthesizers, while "Fool" is characterized as a 1990s-inspired R&B number with a "slow-burning" vocal performance. "What Do I Do" is a 2000s-inspired dance song in which Tiffany, according to Chester Chin from The Star, "channels R&B diva vibe." "Yellow Light" was detailed as a 1990s R&B-leaning track, while the last track "Once in a Lifetime", as opposed to the rest of the album, is an acoustic ballad.

== Release and promotion ==
On May 4, 2016, Tiffany was officially announced to be debuting as a solo artist with I Just Wanna Dance. The album was released one week after on May 11, 2016. After receiving good feedback from the international fanbase, a remix for the English version of "I Just Wanna Dance", by South Korean music producer Kago Pengchi, was released on May 23, 2016.

A promotional showcase for I Just Wanna Dance, where Tiffany performed four of the album's songs for the first time, was held on May 10, 2016. Afterwards, the singer also held a live show where she interacted with fans through a Naver online app. On May 12, 2016, she made her debut performance on Mnet's weekly music television program M! Countdown. Tiffany spent June 2016 promoting the album through a series of small concerts titled Weekend. The concert was held at the SMTown COEX Artium in Gangnam, Seoul and took place on June 10–12 and June 24–26, 2016; it was a sold-out.

== Reception ==
Professional ratings
Review scores
Source	Rating
IZM	3.5/5 stars
Spin	7/10
The Star	5/10
The Straits Times	2.5/5 stars

I Just Wanna Dance received positive reviews from music critics. A writer from Popjustice wrote: "The EP contains very good music and comes with very good artwork." Jeff Benjamin writing for Fuse noted the "unexpected sonic and vocal environments" on the title track "I Just Wanna Dance" and compared its musical styles to those of Carly Rae Jepsen, Ariana Grande and Mariah Carey. He also complimented the "cool, synth-driven feel" of the EP with standouts including "Talk", "Yellow Light" and "Fool". Lee Suho from South Korean magazine IZM praised the EP's synthpop and R&B styles and commented that Tiffany's vocals were soft enough to "harmonize with the sounds naturally;" he however picked the ballad "Once in a Lifetime" as a "disappointment" that does not fit into the EP's musical styles. Chester Chin from The Star was not enthusiastic towards the EP, writing that Tiffany opted for "sexy shimmering melodies" instead of "one-two punch hooks and memorable choruses". He concluded that the album is "too safe for its own good".

Billboard ranked I Just Wanna Dance at number 7 on their list of top 10 K-pop albums of 2016.

Upon the release of the album, the title track debuted at number 8 on the Twitter Top Tracks by Billboard, and number 49 on the Spotify Viral 50. Joey Nolfi from Entertainment Weekly listed "I Just Wanna Dance" as one of the six songs that their readers should be listening to during May 2016. The song was nominated for Best Dance Performance Solo and Song of the Year at the 18th Mnet Asian Music Awards.

== Track listing ==
No.	Title	Lyrics	Music	Arrangement	Length
1.	"I Just Wanna Dance"	Hwang Hyun	Timothy "Bos" Bullock; Michael Jiminez; Sara Forsberg; MZMC	Timothy "Bos" Bullock	3:29
2.	"Talk"	Jung Joo-hee; Kim Min-ji; Baek In-kyung; Nicola Roberts	Dan Traynor (Grades); Caroline Ailin; Nicola Roberts	Dan Traynor (Grades); Caroline Ailin; Nicola Roberts	3:34
3.	"Fool"	Yorkie; Ryu-woo	Im Kwang-wook; Ryan Kim; Amanda Moseley; Chase; Dopio; Wkly	Im Kwang-wook; Ryan Kim; Amanda Moseley; Chase; Dopio; Wkly	3:28
4.	"What Do I Do"	SooYoung	Tiffany; Kim Tae-sung; Jake K	Tiffany; Kim Tae-sung; Jake K	3:03
5.	"Yellow Light"	Jung Joo-hee	Melanie Fontana; Eric Sanicola; Damon Sharpe	Eric Sanicola; Damon Sharpe	3:22
6.	"Once in a Lifetime"	Hwang Hyun; Agnes Shin	Lee Joo-hyung; Sebastian Thott; Delisa Thomas	Lee Joo-hyung; Sebastian Thott	3:51
Total length:					20:47

Apple Music, Spotify and Google Play Music bonus track
No.	Title	Lyrics	Music	Arrangement	Length
7.	"What Do I Do" (English version)	Tiffany	Tiffany; Kim Tae-sung; Jake K	Tiffany; Kim Tae-sung; Jake K	3:03
Total length:					23:50

== Charts ==
Chart	Peak position
Japan (Oricon)	41
South Korea (Gaon)	3
Taiwan (G-Music East Asia)	1
US World Albums (Billboard)	3
US Top Heatseekers (Billboard)	10

=== Year-end chart ===
Chart (2016)	Position
South Korea (Gaon)	47

== Release history ==
Region	Date	Format	Label
South Korea	May 11, 2016	CD; digital download	S.M. Entertainment; KT Music
Worldwide	May 11, 2016	Digital download	S.M. Entertainment
Taiwan	June 8, 2016	CD	Universal Music Group

== See also ==
- Tiffany Young discography
