= Tiffany Young =

American singer and actress (born 1989)

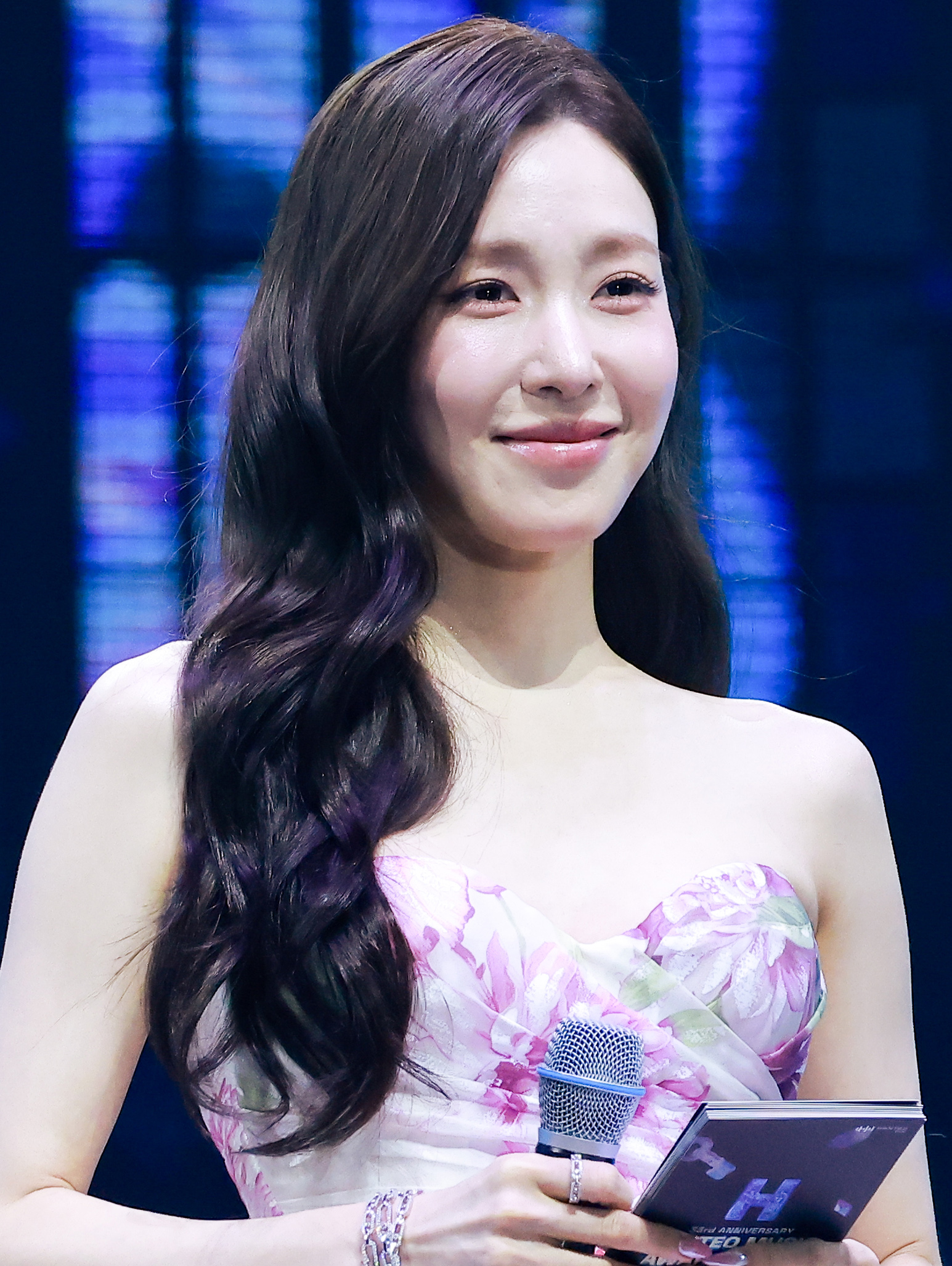
- Young in 2026
- Born: Stephanie Young Hwang; August 1, 1989 (age 37); San Francisco, California, U.S.
- Other name: Hwang Mi-young
- Education: Diamond Bar High School; Korea Kent Foreign School
- Occupations: Singer-songwriter; TV host; actress
- Agent: Pacific Music Group
- Spouse: Byun Yo-han (m. 2026)
- Musical career
- Genres: K-pop; synth-pop; R&B
- Instrument: Vocals
- Years active: 2007–present
- Labels: SM; Transparent Arts; Sublime; Pacific Music Group
- Member of: Girls' Generation; Girls' Generation-TTS; SM Town
- Website: Official website

Korean name
- Hangul: 황미영
- RR: Hwang Miyeong
- MR: Hwang Miyŏng

Stephanie Young Hwang (born August 1, 1989), known professionally as Tiffany or Tiffany Young, is an American singer-songwriter and actress of Korean descent. Born and raised in California, she was discovered by South Korean entertainment agency SM Entertainment at the age of fifteen and subsequently moved to South Korea. After two years of training, Young debuted as a member of girl group Girls' Generation (and later its subgroup Girls' Generation-TTS) in August 2007, which went on to become one of the best-selling artists in South Korea and one of South Korea's most widely known girl groups worldwide.

In 2016, Young became the second Girls' Generation member to debut as a soloist with the release of her first extended play I Just Wanna Dance. Although Young remains a member of Girls' Generation, she left SM Entertainment in October 2017. She joined Paradigm Talent Agency and signed with record label Transparent Arts prior to the release of her 2019 extended play Lips on Lips.

== Life and career ==
=== 1989–2012: Early life and career beginnings ===
Young was born Stephanie Young Hwang on August 1, 1989, in San Francisco, California. Her family currently consists of her father, an older sister, and an older brother. She lived with her family, including her grandparents, who alongside her mother contributed to a mix in Korean and American culture in the household. Her mother died when she was 12 years old, and she is estranged from her father. She grew up in Diamond Bar, California, and was inspired by K-pop artist BoA. Encouraged by her brother, at the age of 15, Young participated in a singing contest. She was spotted by a local SM Entertainment representative, auditioned, and was accepted as a trainee. She moved to South Korea three weeks later.

Young attended Korea Kent Foreign School and was trained at SM Entertainment for almost four years. She officially debuted as a member of South Korean girl group Girls' Generation in August 2007. The singer adopted the stage name Tiffany, the name her mother initially wanted to name her at birth. Besides Girls' Generation, Young's early solo work mostly involved songs recorded for side projects and original soundtracks. Throughout her career, she also participated as the host for several television programs. In early 2008, Young was diagnosed with vocal nodules and had to receive medical treatment. The symptoms relapsed in 2009 and 2010 in which the singer had to take a short break from her activities.

=== 2012–2016: Girls' Generation TTS, solo debut and controversy ===
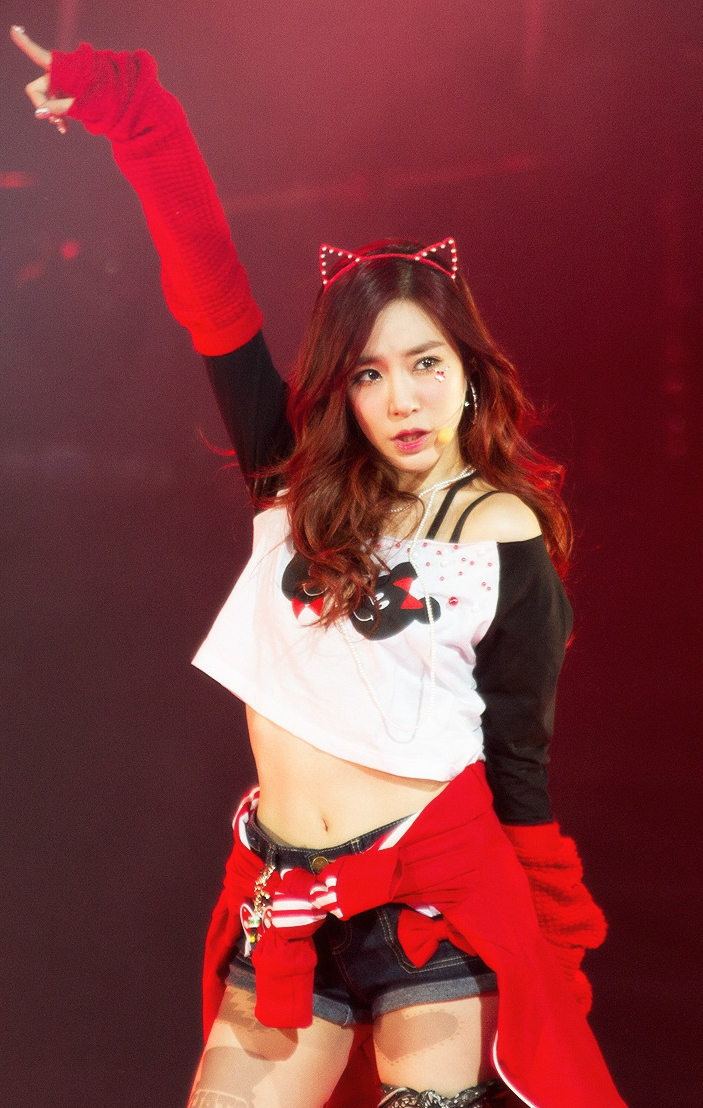
Young performing in January 2013

In December 2011–January 2012, Young debuted as a musical actress through a lead role in the Korean adaptation of musical Fame. She played the character Carmen Diaz, a performing arts student who "hopes to rise to stardom by working tirelessly on her craft". In April 2012, a Girls' Generation subgroup named TTS was formed with Young and fellow members Taeyeon and Seohyun. Their debut EP, Twinkle, debuted at number one on the Gaon Album Chart and went on to become the eighth highest selling album of the year in South Korea with over 140,000 copies sold. The subgroup went on to release two more EPs: Holler (2014) and Dear Santa (2015). In November 2013, Young participated as a contestant in the SBS' reality program Fashion King Korea – a program where South Korean celebrities team up with the nation's top designers to compete in fashion challenges and missions. The singer was paired with designer Ji Il-geun and finished the program in third place.

During the summer of 2015, Young began work on a solo record, with the mentality of it being the "transition into the next chapter of [her] music career." She participated in writing music since 2014, calling it "nerve-wrecking [sic] to put out music [she's] written on [her] own." Young named Girls' Generation's Taeyeon as "a big part" that helped her throughout the preparation process for the album. The two singers have been known to be best friends since Young's arrival in South Korea in 2004. The album, titled I Just Wanna Dance, was released in May 2016, making Young the second Girls' Generation member to have a solo debut. Her album met with mixed but generally favorable reviews. Billboard's Tamar Herman called the album an "audible canvas to paint a new image for [Young]", elaborating that it "showcases [her] range as an artist." The album, having a more American influence than typical K-pop, debuted at number three on both the Billboard World Albums Chart and South Korea's Gaon Album Chart. It sold 61,409 physical copies and was chosen by Billboard as the seventh best K-pop album of 2016. The lead single, and title track, "I Just Wanna Dance" debuted at number 10 on both the Billboard World Digital Songs Chart and the Gaon Digital Chart. In June 2016, the follow-up single "Heartbreak Hotel", featuring Simon Dominic, was released through SM Station digital music platform. To accompany her solo releases, Young held a series of small concerts titled Weekend during the same month.

In August 2016 during the SMTown Live concert in Tokyo, Young posted photos that involved use of the Japanese flag and Rising Sun Flag imagery to indicate her whereabouts on her social media accounts to interact with fans. Though there was no evidence of ill-intentions, this caused heavy criticism from the Korean public as the timing coincided with Korean Liberation Day, stirring a historical war wound sentiment. This event caused her to step down from Sister's Slam Dunk, a KBS2 variety show that she participated in at that time. Young expressed regret for her actions in two handwritten apologies posted to her social media accounts, acknowledging her lack of history knowledge. After the controversial blunder, some media spoke out in defense of Young, while others questioned the misogyny within Korean society, arguing that it can be "unforgiving" towards a female artist while a male counterpart would not receive the same treatment if the same event had occurred.

In October 2016, Young featured on the Far East Movement single "Don't Speak" for their Identity album. In an interview with Billboard, the hip-hop group said that working with Young "really opened our eyes", commenting on "how versatile her range is as a singer."

=== 2017–present: Departure from SM Entertainment and solo career ===
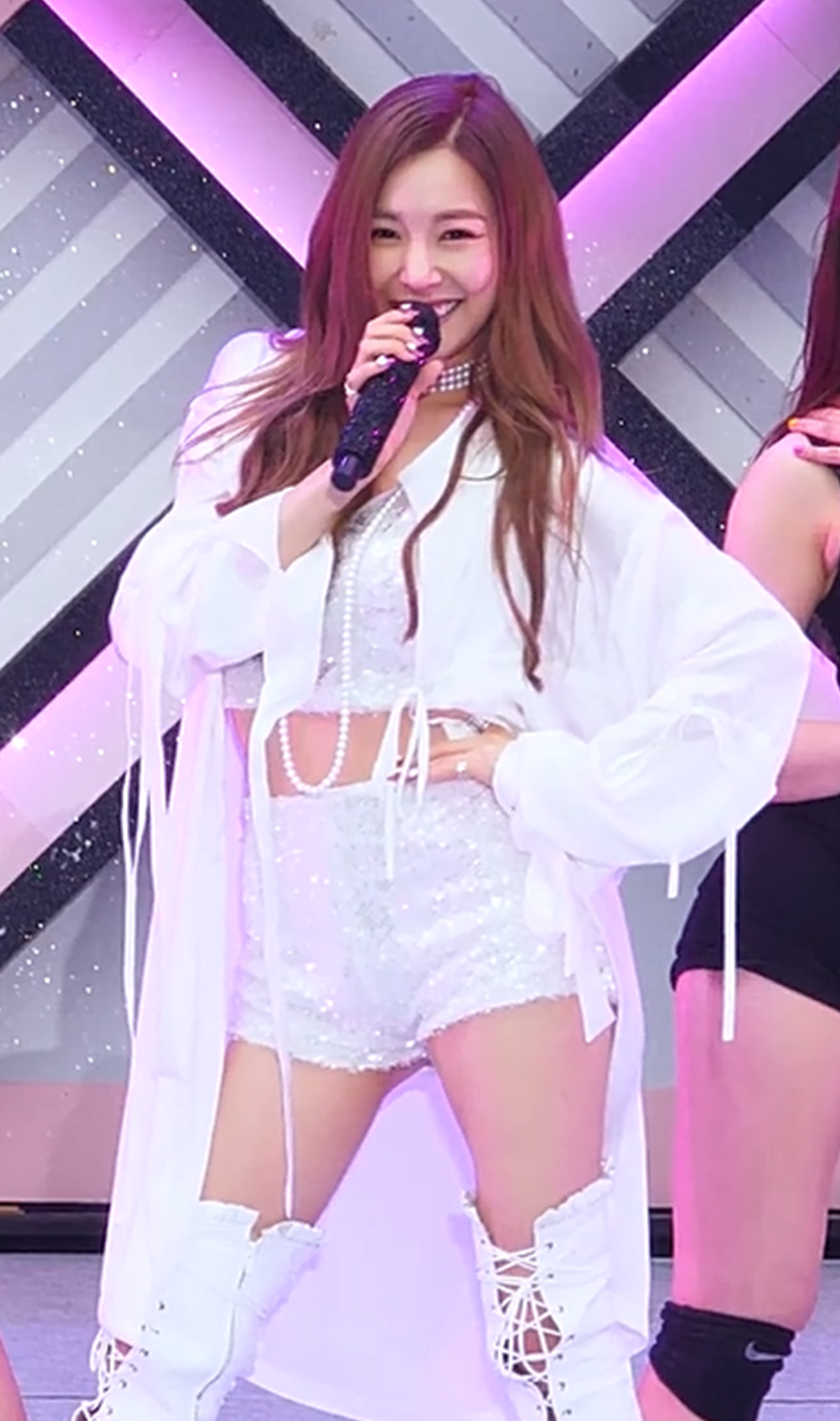
Young performing in July 2017

Young left SM Entertainment in October 2017 and her future activities with Girls' Generation remain in discussion. She moved back to Los Angeles to study acting and pursue a solo singing career.

On March 14, 2018, Young released a cover of "Remember Me," the theme song of the Pixar film Coco, as a single under the stage name Tiffany Young. In June 2018, it was announced that she would be debuting in the United States under Paradigm Talent Agency. She signed with Transparent Arts as her new record label, with "Over My Skin" as her first U.S. solo single.

Young collaborated with and was made the face for H&M's Autumn 2018 campaign. To coincide with their Divided Music fall campaign, Young released her second U.S. single, "Teach You", which was released on September 28, 2018. In October 2018, Young was the first female K-pop artist to walk the red carpet of the American Music Awards. She released a holiday single, "Peppermint", on November 30, 2018.

On January 9, 2019, Young announced her next single, "Born Again," which would be released on January 24 as the lead single of her next EP, entitled Lips on Lips; the single was moved one day later, on January 25, with Fernando Garibay confirmed as the song's producer. The music video of "Born Again" was released alongside the single on January 25. The EP's title track was released as the second single on February 14. Lips on Lips was released on February 22 and featured songwriting collaborations with artists such as Babyface.

Lips on Lips debuted at number nine on Billboard's Heatseekers Albums chart and number thirty on the Independent Albums chart, with 1,000 copies downloaded and 380,000 on-demand audio streams. The EP also peaked at number eight at the Gaon Album Chart, and was certified Platinum in South Korea a week after its release. She promoted the EP through her Lips on Lips Mini Showcase Tour, which spanned eight dates around North America in March 2019. She won Best Solo Breakout at the 2019 iHeartRadio Music Awards, becoming the first female Korean artist to win an iHeartRadio Music Award.

Young released a new single, "Magnetic Moon", on August 2, coinciding with her Open Hearts Eve concert in Seoul on the next day, as well as another concert in Bangkok on August 17. Subsequently, she embarked on the Magnetic Moon Tour from October to November 2019, which covered eighteen tour stops in North America.

On February 16, 2021, Young was cast as Roxie Hart in the South-Korean production of the Broadway musical Chicago. To win the role, Young participated in an open audition from which only 22 actors were selected from over a thousand applicants. Young stated that she dreamed of being a musical actress and that Roxie is one of the top three roles she wanted to play.

On June 29, 2021, it was announced that Young would be making her acting debut in a supporting role in JTBC's Reborn Rich television series.

In December 2022, Young signed an exclusive contract with Sublime. In February 2023, Young held a fan-meeting "Forever Wishing" in Thailand.

On April 2, 2026, Young signed an exclusive contract with the Korean branch of Pacific Music Group and prepared her 10th anniversary solo debut album and activities. On April 24, Young announced through her social media channels she would release a new single titled "Summer's Not Over" on May 8 to commemorate the tenth anniversary of her solo debut. On August 20, she released Edge of Calm, her first studio album, and would have an Asian tour starting in September and ending in December of the same year.

== Personal life ==
On December 13, 2025, Young and South Korean actor Byun Yo-han publicly confirmed their relationship. Byun's agency, Team Hope, said that the two were dating seriously with marriage in mind. Young also addressed the relationship in a handwritten letter on Instagram. The couple reportedly became close after co-starring in the 2024 Disney+ drama Uncle Samsik.

On February 27, 2026, it was reported that Young and Byun had legally registered their marriage. According to an official statement released the same day, the couple completed their marriage registration privately and planned to hold a small, intimate wedding ceremony at a later date.

== Activism ==
Young is an open supporter of the LGBT community. In 2018, she wrote a love letter to the LGBTQ community for Gay Pride Month, stating that she is inspired by the themes the community and that the yearly pride parade "speaks truth on how this world can grow to be a better place". During Pride Month 2021, Young joined Seoul-based LGBT collective Neon Milk along with other queer entertainers to dance to Girls' Generation's 2007 song "Into the New World", now a protest anthem in South Korea. Neon Milk have used the song as their anthem every year for Pride. She later reaffirmed her support for the community on the televised newscast JTBC Newsroom.

== Endorsements ==
In 2008, Young was chosen as the model for Aekyung's A-Solution.

In 2010, she was selected as the model for L'Oréal's Biotherm alongside Yuri and Sooyoung.

In 2013, she was chosen as the model for Lipken Cosmetics.

In 2018, Young was chosen as the face of 2018 fall H&M music campaign.

In 2021, she was selected by IOPE as the campaign artist for "Love, Potentials". She was also selected as the official model for the pharmaceutical brand Life's Promise.

In 2022, Young was chosen as the ambassador for the French perfume house, Atelier Cologne. She was also selected as the main model for Cellivery Living & Health's new brand Celligram.

In 2023, Young was selected as the brand muse for Satin, a women's clothing brand by Maison YS for the 2023 season. She was also chosen as the brand ambassador for the CFDA's golf wear brand Fair Liar and for the skincare brand Joseon Beauty. In August, Italian luxury fashion brand Moschino named Young as its house ambassador.

== Discography ==
- Edge of Calm (2026)

== Concerts ==
=== Headlining ===
- The Agit: Tiffany's Weekend (2016)
- Lips on Lips North American Mini Showcase Tour (2019)
- Open Hearts Eve (2019–2020)
- Magnetic Moon North American Tour (2019)
- Here for You (2025)
- Edge of Calm Tour (2026)

== Filmography ==
=== Film ===
Year	Title	Role	Notes	Ref.
2012	I Am	Herself	Biographical film of SMTOWN	
2014	My Brilliant Life	Herself	Cameo	
2015	SMTown The Stage	Herself	Documentary film of SMTOWN	
2026	Niko	Niko	Film debut	

=== Television series ===
Year	Title	Role	Notes	Ref.
2008	Unstoppable Marriage	Bulgwang-dong's Seven Princesses Gang	Cameo (Episode 64)	
2015	The Producers	Herself	Cameo (Episode 1)	
2022	Reborn Rich	Rachel		
2024	Uncle Samsik	Rachel Jung		

=== Television show ===
Year	Title	Role	Notes	Ref.
2007–2008	Boys & Girls Music Countdown	Co-host	With Kim Hye-seong	
2007–2008	Champagne	Co-host		
2008	Kko Kko Tours Single Single: Season 1	Regular cast		
2009–2012	Show! Music Core	Co-host	With Yuri	
2012–2013	Show! Music Core	Co-host	With Taeyeon and Seohyun	
2013	Fashion King Korea	Regular cast/Contestant	Third place	
2015	Heart A Tag	Co-host	With Lee Cheol-woo	
2016	Sister's Slam Dunk: Season 1	Regular cast		
2019	King of Mask Singer	Contestant	As "The Rose of Versailles"	
2020	The Dog I Encountered	Regular cast		
2021	Girls Planet 999	Mentor		
2021	Pet Vitamin	Co-host	With Park Soo-hong and Hwang Kwang-hee	
2023	Peak Time	Judge		
2026	Veiled Cup	Judge		

=== Web show ===
Year	Title	Role	Notes	Ref.
2021	Breakfast With Tiffany	Host	SBS's Mobidic channel	

=== Hosting ===
Year	Title	Notes	Ref.
2009	Incheon Korean Music Wave	with Yuri and Oh Sang-jin	
2010	Incheon Korean Music Wave	with Yuri and Oh Sang-jin	
2011	MBC Korean Music Wave in Bangkok	with Yuri and Nichkhun	
2011	Incheon Korean Music Wave	with Yuri and Oh Sang-jin	
2011	K-Pop All Star Live in Niigata	with Yuri and Sooyoung	
2012	MBC Korean Music Wave in Bangkok	with Taeyeon and Nichkhun	
2012	MBC Korean Music Wave in LA–SM Town Special!	with Taeyeon and Leeteuk	
2012	MBC Korean Music Wave in Google	with Taeyeon	
2012	SBS K-Pop Super Concert	with Jung Yong-hwa and Lee Gi-kwang	
2013	Incheon Korean Music Wave	with Yuri	
2014	MBC Korean Music Wave in Beijing	with Yuri	
2021	Ontact 2021 Yeongdong-daero K-Pop Concert	with Leeteuk	
2022	2022 Yeongdong-daero K-pop concert	with Hyunjae	
2024	33rd Seoul Music Awards	with Lee Seung-gi, BamBam and Youngjae	
2024	2024 Asia Contents Awards & Global OTT Awards	with Kang Ki-young	

== Musical theatre ==
Year	Title	Role	Ref.
2011–2012	Fame	Carmen Diaz	
2021–2022	Chicago	Roxie Hart	
2024	Chicago	Roxie Hart	
2026	Yumi's Cells	Kim Yumi	

== Awards and nominations ==
Name of the award ceremony, year presented, category, nominee of the award, and the result of the nomination
Award ceremony	Year	Category	Nominee / Work	Result	Ref.
Asia Contents Awards & Global OTT Awards	2024	Best Newcomer Actress	Uncle Samsik	Nominated	
Blue Dragon Series Awards	2024	Best Supporting Actress	Uncle Samsik	Nominated	
iHeartRadio Music Awards	2019	Best Solo Breakout	Tiffany Young	Won	
Korea Arts and Culture Awards	2021	Musical Division	Tiffany Young	Won	
MBC Entertainment Awards	2011	Special Award: MC Division	Tiffany Young (with Yuri); Show! Music Core	Won	
Mnet 20's Choice Awards	2008	Hot School Girl	Tiffany Young	Nominated	
Mnet Asian Music Awards	2009	Best OST	"By Myself"	Nominated	
Mnet Asian Music Awards	2016	Best Dance Performance Solo	"I Just Wanna Dance"	Nominated	
Mnet Asian Music Awards	2016	Song of the Year	"I Just Wanna Dance"	Nominated	
