= Over My Skin =

Single by Tiffany Young
- Released: June 28, 2018
- Length: 2:56
- Label: Transparent Arts
- Songwriters: Tiffany Young; Kev Nish; Rachel West
- Producers: Far East Movement; Khwezi

Tiffany Young singles chronology
"Don't Speak" (2016)	"Over My Skin" (2018)	"Teach You" (2018)

"Over My Skin" is a song recorded by American singer Tiffany Young. It was released on June 28, 2018, by Transparent Arts as a digital single.

This is her first single under Transparent Arts since her departure from SM Entertainment in late 2017.

== Background and release ==
Tiffany left SM Entertainment in October 2017 after 10 years as part of the girl group Girls' Generation. It was stated that her participation in future activities from the group would be discussed.

The song was released on June 28, 2018, through several music portals, including iTunes.

== Composition ==
The song was written by Tiffany Young, Kev Nish and Rachel West. It was produced by Far East Movement and Khwezi. "Over My Skin" was described as a "90s-inspired Pop track" with funky brass and R&B leanings. Lyrically the song talks about confidence, sensuality and female empowerment.

== Music video ==
On the day of release, Billboard reported that a music video was in the works with no further details. The music video was uploaded to Tiffany's YouTube channel on August 2, 2018.
