= 21st Annual D.I.C.E. Awards =

Video game award ceremony

- Date: February 22, 2018
- Venue: Mandalay Bay Convention Center
- Country: Paradise, Nevada, USA
- Hosted by: Jessica Chobot and Greg Miller

Highlights
- Most awards: The Legend of Zelda: Breath of the Wild (4)
- Most nominations: Horizon Zero Dawn (10)
- Game of the Year: The Legend of Zelda: Breath of the Wild
- Lifetime Achievement: Genyo Takeda

The 21st Annual D.I.C.E. Awards was the 21st edition of the D.I.C.E. Awards, an annual awards event that honored the best games in the video game industry during 2017. The awards were arranged by the Academy of Interactive Arts & Sciences (AIAS), and were held at the Mandalay Bay Convention Center in Paradise, Nevada on February 22, 2018. It was also held as part of the Academy's 2018 D.I.C.E. Summit, and was co-hosted by Jessica Chobot of Nerdist News, and Kinda Funny co-founder Greg Miller.

"Role-Playing Game of the Year" dropped the "Massively Multiplayer" part of the category's title.

The Legend of Zelda: Breath of the Wild won the most awards, including "Game of the Year", while Horizon Zero Dawn received the most nominations. Nintendo and Sony Computer Entertainment tied for being the most nominated publisher. Nintendo was the most award-winning developer and publisher, and had the most nominated and award-winning games. The Mario franchise became the first franchise to have three award-winning titles in a single year: Super Mario Odyssey won "Outstanding Achievement in Sound Design", Mario Kart 8 Deluxe won "Racing Game of the Year", and Mario + Rabbids Kingdom Battle won "Strategy/Simulation Game of the Year". Nintendo EPD was the only developer with more than one award-winning game.

Genyo Takeda, former CEO and long-time Special Corporate Advisor of Nintendo, received the "Lifetime Achievement Award".

== Winners and Nominees ==
Winners are listed first, highlighted in boldface, and indicated with a double dagger (‡).

=== Game of the Year awards ===
**Game of the Year**: **The Legend of Zelda: Breath of the Wild** — **Nintendo EPD**‡; Cuphead — Studio MDHR; Horizon Zero Dawn — Guerrilla Games, Sony Interactive Entertainment; PlayerUnknown's Battlegrounds — PUBG Corporation, Bluehole; Super Mario Odyssey — Nintendo EPD
| **Outstanding Achievement in Online Gameplay**: **PlayerUnknown's Battlegrounds** — **PUBG Corporation**, **Bluehole**‡; Call of Duty: WWII — Sledgehammer Games, Activision; Destiny 2 — Bungie, Activision; Fortnite — Epic Games; Tom Clancy's Ghost Recon: Wildlands — Ubisoft Paris | **D.I.C.E. Sprite Award**: **Snipperclips** — **SFB Games**, **Nintendo**‡; Everything — David OReilly, Double Fine Productions; Gorogoa — Jason Roberts, Buried Signal, Annapurna Interactive; Night in the Woods — Secret Lab, Infinite Fall, Finji; Pyre — Supergiant Games |
| **Handheld Game of the Year**: **Metroid: Samus Returns** — **MercurySteam**, **Nintendo EPD**‡; Dragon Quest VIII: Journey of the Cursed King (Note: Nintendo 3DS version.) — Square Enix, Nintendo; Etrian Odyssey V: Beyond the Myth — Atlus; Fire Emblem Echoes: Shadows of Valentia — Intelligent Systems, Nintendo; Monster Hunter Stories — Capcom, Marvelous Inc., Nintendo | **Mobile Game of the Year**: **Fire Emblem Heroes** — **Intelligent Systems**, **Nintendo**‡; Cat Quest — The Gentlebros, PQube; Gorogoa — Jason Roberts, Buried Signal, Annapurna Interactive; Monument Valley 2 — ustwo; Splitter Critters — RAC7 Games |

=== Immersive Reality awards ===
| **Immersive Reality Game of the Year**: **Lone Echo** — **Ready at Dawn**, **Oculus Studios**‡; Psychonauts in the Rhombus of Ruin — Double Fine Productions; Robo Recall — Epic Games; Space Pirate Trainer — I-Illusions; Wilson's Heart — Twisted Pixel Games, Oculus Studios | **Immersive Reality Technical Achievement**: **Lone Echo** — **Ready at Dawn**, **Oculus Studios**‡; Robo Recall — Epic Games; Star Trek: Bridge Crew — Red Storm Entertainment, Ubisoft; The Invisible Hours — Tequila Works, GameTrust Games; Wilson's Heart — Twisted Pixel Games, Oculus Studios |

=== Craft awards ===
| **Outstanding Achievement in Game Direction**: **The Legend of Zelda: Breath of the Wild** — **Nintendo EPD**‡; Gorogoa — Jason Roberts, Buried Signal, Annapurna Interactive; Horizon Zero Dawn — Guerrilla Games, Sony Interactive Entertainment; Uncharted: The Lost Legacy — Naughty Dog, Sony Interactive Entertainment; What Remains of Edith Finch — Giant Sparrow, Annapurna Interactive | **Outstanding Achievement in Game Design**: **The Legend of Zelda: Breath of the Wild** — **Nintendo EPD**‡; Gorogoa — Jason Roberts, Buried Signal, Annapurna Interactive; Horizon Zero Dawn — Guerrilla Games, Sony Interactive Entertainment; PlayerUnknown's Battlegrounds — PUBG Corporation, Bluehole; Super Mario Odyssey — Nintendo EPD |
| **Outstanding Achievement in Animation**: **Cuphead** — **Studio MDHR**‡; For Honor — Ubisoft Montreal; Hellblade: Senua's Sacrifice — Ninja Theory; Horizon Zero Dawn — Guerrilla Games, Sony Interactive Entertainment; Uncharted: The Lost Legacy — Naughty Dog, Sony Interactive Entertainment | **Outstanding Achievement in Art Direction**: **Cuphead** — **Studio MDHR**‡; Hellblade: Senua's Sacrifice — Ninja Theory; Horizon Zero Dawn — Guerrilla Games, Sony Interactive Entertainment; Little Nightmares — Tarsier Studios, Bandai Namco Entertainment; The Legend of Zelda: Breath of the Wild — Nintendo EPD |
| **Outstanding Achievement in Character**: **Senua** **(Hellblade: Senua's Sacrifice)** — **Ninja Theory**‡; Bayek (Assassin's Creed Origins) — Ubisoft Montreal; Aloy (Horizon Zero Dawn) — Guerrilla Games, Sony Interactive Entertainment; Iden Versio (Star Wars Battlefront II) — DICE, Motive Studios, Criterion Games, Electronic Arts; Chloe Frazer (Uncharted: The Lost Legacy) — Naughty Dog, Sony Interactive Entertainment | **Outstanding Achievement in Original Music Composition**: **Cuphead** — **Studio MDHR**‡; Call of Duty: WWII — Sledgehammer Games, Activision; Horizon Zero Dawn — Guerrilla Games, Sony Interactive Entertainment; RiME — Tequila Works, Grey Box; Wolfenstein II: The New Colossus — MachineGames, Bethesda Softworks |
| **Outstanding Achievement in Sound Design**: **Super Mario Odyssey** — **Nintendo EPD**‡; Destiny 2 — Bungie, Activision; Injustice 2 — NetherRealm Studios, Warner Bros. Interactive Entertainment; Star Wars Battlefront II — DICE, Motive Studios, Criterion Games, Electronic Arts; Uncharted: The Lost Legacy — Naughty Dog, Sony Interactive Entertainment | **Outstanding Achievement in Story**: **Horizon Zero Dawn** — **Guerrilla Games**, **Sony Interactive Entertainment**‡; Hellblade: Senua's Sacrifice — Ninja Theory; Night in the Woods — Secret Lab, Infinite Fall, Finji; What Remains of Edith Finch — Giant Sparrow, Annapurna Interactive; Wolfenstein II: The New Colossus — MachineGames, Bethesda Softworks |
**Outstanding Technical Achievement**: **Horizon Zero Dawn** — **Guerrilla Games**, **Sony Interactive Entertainment**‡; Assassin's Creed Origins — Ubisoft Montreal; Hellblade: Senua's Sacrifice — Ninja Theory; Lone Echo — Ready at Dawn, Oculus Studios; The Legend of Zelda: Breath of the Wild — Nintendo EPD

=== Genre awards ===
| **Action Game of the Year**: **PlayerUnknown's Battlegrounds** — **PUBG Corporation**, **Bluehole**‡; Call of Duty: WWII — Sledgehammer Games, Activision; Cuphead — Studio MDHR; Destiny 2 — Bungie, Activision; Wolfenstein II: The New Colossus — MachineGames, Bethesda Softworks | **Adventure Game of the Year**: **The Legend of Zelda: Breath of the Wild** — **Nintendo EPD**‡; Assassin's Creed Origins — Ubisoft Montreal; Horizon Zero Dawn — Guerrilla Games, Sony Interactive Entertainment; Super Mario Odyssey — Nintendo EPD; Uncharted: The Lost Legacy — Naughty Dog, Sony Interactive Entertainment |
| **Family Game of the Year**: **Snipperclips** — **SFB Games**, **Nintendo**‡; DropMix — Harmonix, Hasbro; Gnog — KO_OP, Double Fine Productions; Just Dance 2018 — Ubisoft Paris; SingStar Celebration — SIE London Studio | **Fighting Game of the Year**: **Injustice 2** — **NetherRealm Studios**, **Warner Bros. Interactive Entertainment**‡; Arms — Nintendo EPD; Marvel vs. Capcom: Infinite — Capcom; Nidhogg 2 — Messhof; Tekken 7 — Bandai Namco Entertainment |
| **Racing Game of the Year**: **Mario Kart 8 Deluxe** — **Nintendo EPD**‡; Dirt 4 — Codemasters; Forza Motorsport 7 — Turn 10 Studios, Microsoft Studios; Gran Turismo Sport — Polyphony Digital, Sony Interactive Entertainment; Project CARS 2 — Slightly Mad Studios, Bandai Namco Entertainment | **Role-Playing Game of the Year**: **Nier: Automata** — **PlatinumGames**, **Square Enix**‡; Divinity: Original Sin II — Larian Studios; Middle-earth: Shadow of War — Monolith Productions, Warner Bros. Interactive Entertainment; Persona 5 — Atlus; Torment: Tides of Numenera — inXile Entertainment, Techland Publishing |
| **Sports Game of the Year**: **FIFA 18** — **EA Vancouver**, **EA Romania**‡; Everybody's Golf — SIE Japan Studio, Clap Hanz; Golf Clash — Playdemic; Madden NFL 18 — EA Tiburon; MLB The Show 17 — SIE San Diego | **Strategy/Simulation Game of the Year**: **Mario + Rabbids Kingdom Battle** — **Ubisoft Milan**, **Ubisoft Paris**‡; Endless Space 2 — Amplitude Studios, Sega; Halo Wars 2 — Creative Assembly, Microsoft Studios; Total War: Warhammer II — Creative Assembly, Sega; XCOM 2: War of the Chosen — Firaxis Games, 2K Games |

=== Special awards ===
==== Lifetime Achievement ====
- Genyo Takeda

=== Multiple nominations and awards ===
==== Multiple Nominations ====
Games that received multiple nominations
| Nominations | Game |
|---|---|
| 10 | Horizon Zero Dawn |
| 6 | The Legend of Zelda: Breath of the Wild |
| 5 | Cuphead |
| 5 | Hellblade: Senua's Sacrifice |
| 5 | Uncharted: The Lost Legacy |
| 4 | Gorogoa |
| 4 | PlayerUnknown's Battlegrounds |
| 4 | Super Mario Odyssey |
| 3 | Assassin's Creed Origins |
| 3 | Call of Duty: WWII |
| 3 | Destiny 2 |
| 3 | Lone Echo |
| 3 | Wolfenstein II: The New Colossus |
| 2 | Injustice 2 |
| 2 | Night in the Woods |
| 2 | Robo Recall |
| 2 | Snipperclips |
| 2 | Star Wars Battlefront II |
| 2 | What Remains of Edith Finch |
| 2 | Wilson's Heart |

Nominations by company
| Nominations | Games | Company |
|---|---|---|
| 19 | 10 | Nintendo |
| 19 | 6 | Sony Interactive Entertainment |
| 10 | 1 | Guerrilla Games |
| 8 | 6 | Ubisoft |
| 6 | 2 | Activision |
| 6 | 2 | Annapurna Interactive |
| 5 | 2 | Oculus Studios |
| 5 | 1 | Naughty Dog |
| 5 | 1 | Ninja Theory |
| 5 | 1 | Studio MDHR |
| 4 | 3 | Electronic Arts |
| 4 | 1 | Bluehole |
| 4 | 1 | Buried Signal |
| 4 | 1 | Jason Roberts |
| 4 | 1 | PUBG Corporation |
| 3 | 3 | Bandai Namco Entertainment |
| 3 | 3 | Double Fine Productions |
| 3 | 2 | Epic Games |
| 3 | 2 | Warner Bros. Interactive Entertainment |
| 3 | 1 | Bethesda Softworks |
| 3 | 1 | Bungie |
| 3 | 1 | Sledgehammer Games |
| 3 | 1 | MachineGames |
| 3 | 1 | Ready at Dawn |
| 2 | 2 | Atlus |
| 2 | 2 | Capcom |
| 2 | 2 | Creative Assembly |
| 2 | 2 | Intelligent Systems |
| 2 | 2 | Microsoft Studios |
| 2 | 2 | Sega |
| 2 | 2 | Square Enix |
| 2 | 2 | Tequila Works |
| 2 | 1 | Criterion Games |
| 2 | 1 | DICE |
| 2 | 1 | Finji |
| 2 | 1 | Giant Sparrow |
| 2 | 1 | Infinite Fall |
| 2 | 1 | Motive Studios |
| 2 | 1 | NetherRealm Studios |
| 2 | 1 | Secret Lab |
| 2 | 1 | SFB Games |
| 2 | 1 | Twisted Pixel Games |

==== Multiple awards ====
Games that received multiple awards
| Awards | Game |
|---|---|
| 4 | The Legend of Zelda: Breath of the Wild |
| 3 | Cuphead |
| 2 | Horizon Zero Dawn |
| 2 | Lone Echo |
| 2 | PlayerUnknown's Battlegrounds |
| 2 | Snipperclips |

Awards by company
| Awards | Games | Company |
|---|---|---|
| 10 | 6 | Nintendo |
| 3 | 1 | Studio MDHR |
| 2 | 1 | Bluehole |
| 2 | 1 | Guerrilla Games |
| 2 | 1 | Oculus Studios |
| 2 | 1 | PUBG Corporation |
| 2 | 1 | Ready at Dawn |
| 2 | 1 | SFB Games |
| 2 | 1 | Sony Interactive Entertainment |
