= Kimlinh Tran =

American voice actor

- Born: December 12, 1989 (age 36); Ventura County, California, U.S.
- Other names: Hnilmik, Kimlinh P. Tran
- Occupation: Voice actor
- Years active: 2008–present

Kimlinh Tran (born December 12, 1989), also known by the online pseudonym Hnilmik, is an American voice actor from California. She (Note: Tran uses both she/her and they/them pronouns. This article uses she/her for clarity and consistency.) has done voice work for various anime and video games, as well as several online anime parody fandubs, most notably as Chi-Chi in TeamFourStar's Dragon Ball Z Abridged.

== Career ==
Tran is best known for her voice acting work on various video games, especially for her role of Fidget from Dust: An Elysian Tail and Ms. Fortune and Robo-Fortune from Skullgirls. She has recorded voices for video game developers such as Winter Wolves (Always Remember Me, Loren The Amazon Princess) and Wadjet Eye Games (Gemini Rue). She also voiced over 200 Internet projects. She also voices Valt Aoi from Beyblade Burst since season 3.

== Personal life ==
Tran is asexual and non-binary (specifically demigirl), and uses both she/her and they/them pronouns. She is of Vietnamese descent.

== Filmography ==
=== Animation ===
- Attack on Titan: Abridged – Mikasa Ackerman
- Beyblade Burst – Valt Aoi (Seasons 3-7)
- Cells at Work! – Immature Thymocyte
- Dragon Ball Z: Abridged – Chi-Chi, Godzirra Girl
- Fight Ippatsu! Jūden-chan!! – Charger Girl Engineer
- Hellsing Ultimate Abridged – Yumie Takagi
- Kagemono: The Shadow Folk – Fox
- K-On! Season 2 – Shizuka Kinoshita, Keiko Sano, Kimiko Makigami, Additional Voices
- MapleStory: New Leaf Saga – EP05 – Farah
- Nura: Rise of the Yokai Clan – Additional Voices
- Pokémon the Movie: Secrets of the Jungle - Koko
- RWBY - Volume 9 - Blacksmith
- Sanity Not Included – Amanda
- Secret Millionaires Club "Be Cool To Your School" – Additional Voices
- Squid Girl Volume 2 – Additional Voices
- The Terrain of Magical Expertise (TOME) – Granda
- Toradora! – Additional Voices
- Tweeny Witches – Additional Voices
- The Beachbuds - PonPon

=== Video games ===
- Always Remember Me – Amarantha Finch
- Apotheon – Ares Warrior, Imprisoned Nymph
- Backstage Pass – Professor Meridia
- Cookie Run: Kingdom - Kumiho Cookie
- Cryamore – Bliss Barson
- Eternally Us – Fiona "Fio" Mackenzie
- Dust: An Elysian Tail – Fidget
- DreadOut – Dedemit Pintu, Jurig Pengantin, Palasik
- Galactic Phantasy Prelude – Emma Rose, Ship A.I.
- Gemini Rue – Edward Wong Hau Pepelu Tivrusky IV
- Haunt the House: Terrortown – Ghost Boy, Humans
- Heroes of Newerth – Queen Serecta, Ven, Lightningbringer, Penitent Lodestone
- Loren The Amazon Princess – Loren
- Monster Strike – Sima Yi, Huang Gai, Coral, Pearl, Homumi, Gigabeast Fighters, Poca-Poco, Decarabia
- Rival Threads: Last Class Heroes – Maya Pendleton
- Skullgirls – Ms. Fortune, Robo-Fortune
- Snipperclips – Snip, Clip
- Star Garden – Leo
- Stick It To The Man – Heart the Dog, Cranky Nurse, Maria, Beatrice the Dog, Maggie McAllister, Christina the Ghost Girl, Nurses, Black Widow, Alien Lady, Donna Grandiosa, Sentient Missile, Fetus, Soap Opera Woman
- Wargroove – Ragna
- Zombie Vikings – Ravens, Duck Girl, Pinata Maggot, Toughy Scout, Maggot Guards, Sally the Maggot
- Zwei: The Ilvard Insurrection – Exmachina

=== Crew member ===
- Haunt the House: Terrortown – Casting Coordinator, Voice Director
