= Tangle Tower =

- Developer: SFB Games
- Publisher: SFB Games
- Platforms: Apple Arcade, macOS, Microsoft Windows, Nintendo Switch, PlayStation 4, Xbox One, Android
- Release: Apple Arcade; 19 September 2019 macOS, Switch, Windows; 22 October 2019; PS4, Xbox One; 6 October 2021; Android; 22 June 2023
- Genre: Adventure game
- Mode: Single-player

Tangle Tower (also known as Detective Grimoire: Tangle Tower) is a murder mystery point-and-click adventure game developed and published by SFB Games. It is a sequel to the 2014 game Detective Grimoire and the third entry in the Detective Grimoire series. The game was launched with the Apple Arcade service on 19 September 2019 and was later released for Nintendo Switch and Steam on 22 October 2019, followed by PlayStation 4 and Xbox One on 6 October 2021.

== Gameplay ==
The game follows Detective Grimoire and his partner Sally (who appeared in the previous game with a different hairstyle) as they travel to the eponymous Tangle Tower to solve the murder of a girl named Freya Fellow, who was seemingly killed by a painting. Players progress through the game by conversing with the various suspects and searching each room of the tower for clues. Searching the environment will often unveil puzzles that must be solved in order to obtain a new piece of evidence. When certain conditions are met, the player can question each suspect about something they're hiding.

== Development ==
After Detective Grimoire had been completed in 2014 with a light cliff-hanger ending, the team didn't have an immediate rush to do a sequel; however they soon learnt about the Creative Europe’s funding programme which offered funding for narrative driven games, leading to SFB formulating a sequel; they entered into in programme in January 2015. The original development of Tangle Tower was put on hold after Nintendo approached SFB Games to make Snipperclips, but resumed after the game's expansion, Snipperclips Plus, was completed. The team "dusted off" the project and continued working on it for a 2 years before release. Designed in Unity, the team ensured the game was compatible on a variety of platforms from the get go. The Apple Arcade deadline pushed the development team to tie up loose ends and finish the game. Adam noted that the game went from 90% completion to 80% due to the pushed-up deadline, but that the team were able to finish the project with minimal sacrifices. Due to Apple Arcade's requirements, the game was translated into 17 different languages by Universally Speaking. SFB Games attended their first PAX East Indie Showcase with this title. The game was later released on Steam and Nintendo Switch on 22 October 2019. On 21 December 2020, Jonathan Harris did a 'Tangle Tower unused animation showcase stream'. The game was released for PlayStation 4 and Xbox One on 6 October 2021, with each version playable on PlayStation 5 and Xbox Series X and Series S respectively via backwards compatibility. The game was removed from Apple Arcade in 2019 and subsequently released on Android in 2023.

=== Design ===
Characters were designed by Adam Vian and Catherine Unger, with Adam drawing finished poses into Flash. At this stage, PNGs of these static poses were added to the Unity project with a 'bobbing' effect to give a feel of movement within the scene's dialogue. Animator Jonathan Harris inbetweened each final pose, with multiple head positions, eyes, and mouths for each. Designed by Tom Vian for the 2012 game Detective Grimoire: Secret of the Swamp, FlAn exporter was used to save Flash files as PNGs, which through the TexturePacker tool were all placed into one spritesheet. The FlAn player reconstructed the sprites from the data files. A white outline was added around each character to avoid their outfits blending into similarly coloured backgrounds. A Squigglevision effect was added to this outline to "keep them alive [and] breathing". Tom created a tool using Unity's timelines that allowed Adam to type dialogue and choose poses from a list to perform the text straight-away.

Many character designs were altered throughout development. For example, Fitz Fellow originally wore red opaque glasses in his original design. However, the team would subsequently remove them after they heard Joshua Tomar's voice clips for the characters, as a way of making him appear more sympathetic and vulnerable.

== Reception ==
Reception

Aggregate score
Aggregator	Score
Metacritic	iOS: 82/100; NS: 85/100; PC: 74/100

Review score
Publication	Score
TouchArcade	4.5/5

Tangle Tower received mainly positive reviews, holding an 82/100 score on Metacritic. The game was praised for its voice acting, dialogue, and art style. Negative comments were given about the undeserved ending and lingering plot holes.

ScreenRant wrote it "keep[s] you guessing until the surprising final reveal". Pocket Gamer deemed it "gorgeous" and "thrilling". PC Gamer write it was a "light-hearted, comfy murder mystery", while Rock Paper Shotgun praised its "winsome cast, gorgeous music and sharp writing". CBR highlighted a moment of dialogue that was "endearing" and effectively establishing the dynamic between characters.

Imoire.com noted that "after several satisfying hours worth of gameplay" the game "ends somewhat suddenly" and contains "a handful of loose ends" by its conclusion.

The game was nominated for "EE Mobile Game of the Year" at the 16th British Academy Games Awards.

== Further links ==
- Unused dialogue animations
