= Rime (video game) =

2017 video game

RiME
- Developer: Tequila Works (Note: Ported to Windows and Xbox One by QLOC, and for Nintendo Switch by Tantalus Media)
- Publishers: Grey Box; Six Foot
- Director: Raúl Rubio Munárriz
- Producer: Remy Chinchilla
- Designer: Kevin Sardà Pérez
- Programmer: Carlos M. Vázquez García
- Artist: José Luis Vaello Bertol
- Writers: Rob Yescombe; Raúl Rubio Munárriz
- Composer: David García Díaz
- Engine: Unreal Engine 4
- Platforms: PlayStation 4; Windows; Xbox One; Nintendo Switch
- Release: PS4, Windows, Xbox One; 26 May 2017; Nintendo Switch; NA: 14 November 2017; EU: 17 November 2017 Amazon Luna; 20 October 2020
- Genre: Puzzle
- Mode: Single-player

Rime is a 2017 puzzle video game developed by Tequila Works. The game was released for PlayStation 4, Windows, and Xbox One in May 2017, for Nintendo Switch in November 2017, and for Amazon Luna in October 2020. The game follows a boy arriving at and searching a mysterious island with a fox-like spirit as a guide. The player guides the boy in solving environmental puzzles across five large levels.

Early concept work was undertaken under the working title Echoes of Siren when the game was green-lit by Microsoft, but later rejected. Funding of the game was eventually obtained from Sony for a PlayStation 4 release, with the first trailer released at Gamescom in 2013. Tequila Works re-acquired the rights to the intellectual property in 2016.

== Gameplay ==
Rime is played with a third-person view as the player controls a young boy who has washed ashore on an abandoned island. The player can make the boy run, climb, carry objects, and push or pull larger objects across the island's landscapes. The player can have the boy shout or sing, which can trigger certain events tied to nearby statues, such as causing a door to open for a limited length of time.

Through these commands, the player solves various environmental puzzles. Some of the puzzles are based on the use of perspective, using a special turret-like feature to align several disparate objects to create a doorway on a surface they project onto, or trigger other events in a similar way.

== Plot ==
Rime begins with a boy washed ashore on a mysterious island, with a giant tower at its far end. As the boy explores the island, guided by a magical fox, he encounters a mysterious man in a red cape on several occasions but never reaches him. During the progress of the game, the boy has recollections about how he came to the island. He and his father were at sea when a storm struck and his father fell overboard. The boy tried to save him but could only grab hold of part of the red cloak his father was wearing before the sea took him. The figure in red represents his father, leading him across the island to the far tower.

As the boy climbs the tower, he comes to additional areas, each individually represents the five stages of grief. Eventually reaching the top of the tower and exploring the area representing depression, the boy is forced to let the fox go as it disperses before him. He returns to the central tower and finds that he is now inverted within it, and climbs back through it, eventually reaching the "top", the initial island, now representing acceptance.

At this point, another flashback shows that the story has actually been from the father's perspective the entire time; it was the son that had been lost at sea, and the island and tower have all been part of the father's own mind as he's coming to grips with his loss. Imagining his child having come back to him, the father goes to the boy's room and examines his various toys. As he turns to leave, a vision of his child with his red cloth appears on the bed. He hugs his son, the vision vanishing and leaving the red cloth in his hands. The father releases the cloth, finally letting go and accepting the loss of his son.

If all four instances of the "white shade" throughout the game were found, a vision of the man's deceased wife appears alongside their son, hugging the pair before vanishing along with the boy.

== Development ==
Conceptual design of the game began during the development of Deadlight. An early iteration was a third-person isometric action role-playing game concept originally under the title Echoes of Siren; the game was to include hunting and crafting elements during a day cycle, preparing for combat including tower defense elements during a night cycle; other key game elements were to be exploration, avatar development and customisation. The game was offered to Microsoft as an exclusive Xbox Live Arcade (XBLA) title and possible Windows 8 game; initially Microsoft greenlit the game, but the design was later rejected due to a mismatch with Microsoft's Xbox One XBLA publishing policies which emphasised multiplayer and other social gaming. A development budget was approved by Sony, and the game for a while became a PlayStation 4 exclusive. By September 2016 Tequila Works had reacquired the rights from Sony which resulted in the game becoming a multiplatform release.

The first released trailer for the game was shown in August 2013 in the indie game section of Sony's press conference at Gamescom; showing third-person, adventure video game-type gameplay with a 'cel-shaded' art style. The trailer gameplay and art drew comparisons to games by Team Ico, as well as Journey by Thatgamecompany, and The Legend of Zelda: The Wind Waker. The trailer resulted in an initial positive response from journalists. Creative director Raúl Rubio has also referenced the films Princess Mononoke, Spirited Away, and Jason and the Argonauts, as well as the art work of Joaquin Sorolla, Salvador Dalí and Giorgio de Chirico as influences. Rubio would later note, in a 2016 interview, that the early trailer created added pressure and noted that it was shown "too soon"

The game involves a boy who needs to escape an island and a curse. The game, played through the boy, originally involved puzzle solving in an open world island setting; The game design uses the island environment itself, and audio without a spoken narrative to tell the game's story, a day-night mechanic was retained from the 'Echoes of Siren' design, with light influencing gameplay as well as visual appearance. In the progress of development the original open world design was lost, converted to a more gated progress in 'levels' in an overworld; additionally several game elements were removed such as survival game aspects, including the need to eat and drink, as well as stamina and health stats.

The game was released for PlayStation 4, Windows, and Xbox One on 26 May 2017. A version for the Nintendo Switch, ported over by Tantalus Media, was released in November 2017. A version for Amazon Luna was released on October 20, 2020.

== Reception ==
Reception

Aggregate score
Aggregator	Score
Metacritic	(NS) 64/100 (PC) 78/100 (PS4) 80/100 (XONE) 82/100

Review scores
Publication	Score
Destructoid	7/10
Electronic Gaming Monthly	9/10
Game Informer	8/10
GameSpot	6/10
GamesRadar+	4.5/5
IGN	6.5/10
PC Gamer (US)	62/100
Polygon	6.5/10
VideoGamer.com	7/10

Rime received generally favorable reviews, according to review aggregator website Metacritic.

GameSpot awarded the game a score of 6 out of 10, saying "Although Rime looks and sounds gorgeous, its visual splendor is locked behind frustrating, shallow puzzles and an incomprehensible story, meaning you spend more time figuring out where to go than taking in the world around you."

Marty Sliva of IGN described the game as "Beautiful but shallow" and said that "On the surface, Rime is a gorgeous, melancholy adventure of a lone wanderer in the similar fashion as memorable games like Ico, Journey, or The Witness. But just under that layer of beautiful art, mysterious locations, and wonderful music, is a game with very few new ideas. Instead, almost all of its puzzles are shallow and ultimately uninteresting versions of things we've seen and done in other, better games." Sliva awarded it a score of 6.5 out of 10.

Eurogamer ranked the game 19th on their list of the "Top 50 Games of 2017". The game was nominated for "Best Puzzle Game" at IGN's Best of 2017 Awards.

=== Awards ===
Year	Award	Category	Result	Ref.
2017	Golden Joystick Awards	Best Audio	Nominated	
2018	21st Annual D.I.C.E. Awards	Outstanding Achievement in Original Music Composition	Nominated	
2018	Game Audio Network Guild Awards	Music of the Year	Nominated	
2018	Game Audio Network Guild Awards	Best Original Soundtrack Album	Nominated	

== Legacy ==
In 2021, GQ España named Rime one of the best Spanish-made games ever.
