= Detective Grimoire =

Detective mystery video game series

Detective Grimoire is a series of detective mystery video games developed by SFB Games. The series currently consists of four titles. Additionally, the soundtracks to Detective Grimoire: Secret of the Swamp and Tangle Tower have been released.

== Games ==
=== Detective Grimoire (2007) ===
Detective Grimoire is a flash game developed by SFB Games (formerly The Super Flash Bros.) and published by Armor Games on their website and Newgrounds in 2007. According to one of the developers, this game is considered as a prototype for the later games, and it is not considered part of the series.

=== Detective Grimoire: Secret of the Swamp (2014) ===
Detective Grimoire: Secret of the Swamp is a murder mystery point-and-click adventure game developed by SFB Games and published by Armor Games, which was released on iOS platforms on January 2, 2014. It was later released on Android, PC, Mac, Linux and Steam by SFB Games.

=== Tangle Tower (2019) ===
Tangle Tower is a murder mystery point-and-click adventure game developed and published by SFB Games. It is a sequel to the 2014 game Detective Grimoire. The game initially launched for iOS devices as part of the Apple Arcade subscription service on September 19, 2019, and was later released for Nintendo Switch and PC on October 22, 2019, followed by PlayStation 4 and Xbox One releases on October 6, 2021. Tom Vian noted, "While the game hasn't set the world (or our bank account) on fire, it's been a solid success for us".

ScreenRant praised the "logical, cleverly designed puzzles", the "distinct, entertaining personalities" of the characters, and "unexpected twists and turns" of the story. Nintendo World Report described it as "the closest to a brand-new Layton game you're liable to find in 2020". Tangle Tower won the 2020 IndieCade Award for Best Performance. Additionally, it was nominated for the 16th IMGA.

=== The Mermaid Mask (2026) ===
In March 2020, SFB Games announced they were in the process of writing the next entry in the series, which wouldn't be called Tangle Tower 2 as it would be a brand new story with new characters. The sequel, initially titled The Mermaid's Tongue, was announced for PC and consoles on December 6, 2023 and was originally scheduled for release in 2024, later being renamed to The Mermaid Mask. Due to the success of SFB Games' 2024 game Crow Country, which "diverted (their) attention a little longer than (they)’d initially intended", the game's release was pushed back. The game was released on Steam on July 16, 2026.

== Soundtracks ==
=== Tangle Tower soundtrack ===
SFB Games released the soundtrack to Tangle Tower on June 13, 2020 on services including Spotify, Google Play, and Apple Music using the CD Baby service. Tom Vian commented, "It's made us almost no money, but it's just nice to have it out there!".
