= Robo Recall =

2017 video game

- Developer: Epic Games
- Publisher: Epic Games
- Engine: Unreal Engine 4
- Platforms: Microsoft Windows (Oculus Rift); Oculus Quest
- Release: March 1, 2017 (Oculus Rift); May 21, 2019 (Oculus Quest)
- Genre: First-person shooter

Robo Recall is a virtual reality first-person shooter game developed and published by Epic Games for Oculus Rift and Oculus Quest platforms. The game was released for the Oculus Rift on March 1, 2017, and an Oculus Quest version titled Robo Recall: Unplugged was released on May 21, 2019. Players that activate their Oculus Touch virtual reality controllers with its software are able to download the game for free.

== Plot ==
Players control Agent 34, an employee of RoboReady, a leading manufacturer of service robots. As a Recaller, it is the player's job to remove "defective" robots from circulation. After a virus causes RoboReady's products to rebel against their human masters, the Recaller must disable all defective models and find the cause of the virus. After collecting rogue robots for research and enabling Robo-Relays to shut down the robots in the area, it is revealed that a rogue robot, called Odin, is the one who released the virus, in which his motive was to make the internet belong to him. It is revealed at the end of the game that one of the A.I bots that was leading the player is actually Odin. The Agent eventually defeats Odin, and everything is fixed.

== Gameplay ==
Gameplay takes place from a first-person perspective. The player can access four different weapons: a pistol, a revolver, a shotgun, and a plasma rifle, holstered on the hip or back. Players move by teleporting, which is controlled with the thumbstick. Although principally a shooter, the game allows players to physically grab enemies, dismantle them, throw them, and in some cases use their weaponry against other enemies. Enemy projectiles like bullets and missiles can also be caught and thrown back at enemies. The game awards point bonuses for certain types of kills, and a multiplier for unbroken kill streaks. Scores are uploaded to online rankings at the end of a stage. Later on in the game, new robot types are introduced, such as spider-like bots that explode, drones that fire lasers, giant bots that fires a huge laser, bots that can stop the player from teleporting, bots that fly and shoot rockets, bots with shields and automatic pistols, and bots that can shoot small guided missiles.

== Development ==
Robo Recall was the first full virtual reality game developer Epic Games created, although they had worked on VR tech demos. After completion of Bullet Train, the designers were given the opportunity by Oculus to turn it into a full game. The team was 15 large, taken from other projects Epic was working on at the time. An issue players had with Bullet Train was that they could not interact with the environment, which the designers changed in this game. They kept the teleportation movement of Bullet Train as well, as they wanted to mitigate the risk that someone might get sick while playing. They tied the gameplay into the teleportation mechanic. To do this, they had people in the office who were comparatively susceptible to VR sickness playtest the game. They used motion capture taken from a previous project, but because the motion-capture footage was only six seconds long, the scene they were used in had slow motion added to elongate it.

== Reception ==
Reception

Aggregate score
Aggregator	Score
Metacritic	85/100

Review scores
Publication	Score
Destructoid	8.5/10
Game Informer	8.75/10
IGN	8.5/10

On the day of release the game received an 8.5 out of 10 rating for IGN. The Guardian gave it a score of 5 stars out of 5. It was nominated for "Best VR Game" in Destructoid's Game of the Year Awards, and for "Best Shooter" and "Best VR Experience" in IGN's Best of 2017 Awards. It won the award for "Best Virtual Reality Game" in Game Informer's Best of 2017 Awards, and for "Best VR Shooter" in their 2017 Shooter of the Year Awards.

=== Accolades ===
Year	Award	Category	Result	Ref.
2017	Golden Joystick Awards	Best VR Game	Nominated	
2018	21st Annual D.I.C.E. Awards	Immersive Reality Game of the Year	Nominated	
2018	21st Annual D.I.C.E. Awards	Immersive Reality Technical Achievement	Nominated	
