= Crow Country =

2024 video game

- Digital cover art
- Developer: SFB Games
- Publisher: SFB Games
- Director: Adam Vian
- Programmer: Tom Vian
- Composer: Ockeroid
- Engine: Unity
- Platforms: PlayStation 5; Windows; Xbox Series X/S; Nintendo Switch; PlayStation 4
- Release: PS5, Windows, Xbox Series X/S; 9 May 2024; PS4, Switch; 16 October 2024
- Genre: Survival horror
- Mode: Single-player

Crow Country is a 2024 survival horror video game developed and published by SFB Games. Set in 1990, the story follows investigator Mara Forest, who travels to the abandoned Crow Country theme park in search of its owner, and uncovers the dark secrets the park hides. Gameplay focuses on exploring the park, solving puzzles, and defeating enemies.

The game was announced in 2023. Its visual style and gameplay were designed to be similar to early survival horror titles released for the PlayStation in the 1990s, including Resident Evil and Silent Hill. The developers sought to closely emulate the presentation and design philosophy of older games while introducing modern features such as improved controls for movement and aiming, as well as accessibility options.

Crow Country was released for PlayStation 5, Windows, and Xbox Series X/S in May 2024, with versions for Nintendo Switch and PlayStation 4 following in October. The game received generally positive reviews; critics praised its visual design, narrative, and evocation of earlier horror games, but were divided on its combat and puzzles. It was a commercial success, selling over 100,000 units within six months of release.

== Gameplay ==
Crow Country's presentation and gameplay are modeled after early survival horror games. In this screenshot, Mara engages in combat with an enemy.

Crow Country is a survival horror game inspired by early entries in the Resident Evil and Silent Hill series. Players control Mara Forest, who is tasked with exploring the Crow Country theme park while finding objects, solving puzzles, and defeating monsters.

Combat requires players to aim and shoot at monsters encountered in the park using various weapons. Mara begins the game with a pistol, and can obtain additional weapons such as grenades, a shotgun, and a flamethrower. Players cannot shoot while running, and must stand still to manually focus their aim. Players have limited health, which is depleted by hits from enemies or environmental hazards and traps, and can be replenished using bandages, first aid kits, and antidotes. Healing items and ammunition may be collected by interacting with vending machines and containers.

Players gain access to new areas through exploration, locating keys, and solving puzzles, some of which involve combining items found in different locations. Certain puzzles offer secret items that reward players with weapon and equipment upgrades upon completion. Players also collect notes and diary entries scattered throughout the park, which provide hints for puzzles and reveal story details leading up to the events of the game. In safe rooms, players can save their progress and review a notebook to see all notes collected so far.

Crow Country features two main game modes: "Survival", which features combat and enemies, and "Exploration", which removes enemies and allows players to freely explore the park and solve puzzles. An additional difficulty mode, "Murder of Crows", was added in a post-release update. Enemies deal more damage, supplies are rarer, and Mara cannot run if she is seriously injured.

== Plot ==
In 1990, special agent Mara Forest arrives to investigate Crow Country, an abandoned rural amusement park near Atlanta, Georgia that shut down two years ago. Its founder, Edward Crow, mysteriously disappeared, and Mara is searching for him. Upon arriving at the park, she meets an injured Arthur Mole, a paranormal photographer who warns her of dangerous creatures. She helps him back to her car and continues her investigation, meeting Edward's daughter, Natalie Crow; his foreman, Tolman; lawyer Julie Baron; police detective Harrison James; and Edward's business partner Marvin Trumble, who are all there investigating as well.

While searching Crow Country, she discovers that it hides a dig site that manufactured pure gold seemingly "grown" from root-like structures, and that the park is overrun with zombie-like creatures referred to as "Guests". With pressure from the government questioning where the gold was coming from, Marvin and Crow bought a dried-up gold mine in Brazil to cover their tracks. However, after bad publicity when a 15-year-old girl, Elaine Marshall, was seriously injured in the park, it was forced to shut down. It is revealed that Elaine was attacked by one of the Guests, which appear to be carrying some kind of infectious disease; and that the root-like structures are emerging from a pool deep below the park.

As Mara travels deeper into the park, Harrison is found shot dead by Marvin, who is then accidentally knocked off a catwalk to his death during a confrontation. Mara tells the remaining survivors to escape to her car, while she goes down to the core of the dig site. Eventually, Mara meets a now deformed and infected Edward Crow. He reveals several key pieces of information: any person who comes into contact with a Guest becomes infected, including the investigators. The dig site and its pool are, in reality, a gateway device through which the Guests have been emerging. The first Guest was the only one capable of communicating, as the more the roots were harvested for gold, the more mutated the arriving Guests became. This is because the "roots" are, in fact, focusing antennae allowing the gateway to function correctly. During the conversation, it is revealed that Mara is not a special agent and forged her police documents which she had stolen from Harrison: she is Elaine, infected from contact with a captive Guest. She escaped from the hospital she had been staying at in search of Crow, but not for revenge as he had suspected: instead, to tell him she is dying and that the hospital staff has no cure.

Crow gives Mara a cure he developed by doing multiple tests on the creatures, but he only has five vials. He tells Mara to use them to save herself and the others, as he plans to jump into the pool to see the other side. He also gives her a note transcribed from the first Guest's words, which reveals that the Guests were originally humans from a 22nd-century Earth, attempting to travel back in time to 1988 because the planet had become completely uninhabitable. Crow then jumps into the pool, returning as a grotesque, insane monster, forcing Mara to kill him. Mara escapes in her car with the remaining survivors. Four miles from Crow Country, they relax by a fire and take the cure. Mara reflects on her hope for the future and her fears of the unknown.

== Development and release ==
Crow Country was developed by SFB Games, who were previously known for developing Snipperclips (2017), a launch title for the Nintendo Switch. The game was announced on 23 October 2023, with release planned for 2024, and a demo was made available the same day. A second trailer was released on 14 March 2024, revealing more of the park setting and the graphical style.

The game's graphics and design were inspired by survival horror games released for the PlayStation in the 1990s, including Resident Evil (1996), Resident Evil 2 (1998), and Silent Hill (1999). Additionally, aspects of the character models and environment design were modeled after Final Fantasy VII (1997).

Combat was designed to resemble early Resident Evil games. Game director Adam Vian considered the vulnerability created by players' inability to move while aiming and using weapons to be important for a survival horror game. He also added the ability to freely aim, which he likened to Resident Evil 4 (2005). Vian found a mixture of retro and modern combat mechanics to be a "defining feature" of the game, describing this approach as "classic-style survival horror with modern quality-of-life features".

Originally, the game exclusively used tank controls. However, negative feedback during pre-release testing led Vian to add a modern control scheme and offer tank controls as a secondary movement option. In the final game, the left analog stick provides direct control of Mara, while the D-pad is used for classic tank controls. The game also allows players to rotate the in-game camera, a feature absent in Resident Evil games that used pre-rendered backgrounds.

The developers intended the puzzles to resemble those of retro games while ensuring they were not frustrating for a modern audience. Vian explained that it was "tricky" to create puzzles that would baffle players at first before a solution gradually becomes evident with investigation. The game includes an option to disable enemies, which was intended to improve accessibility for players normally not comfortable with horror titles.

Crow Country was released on 9 May 2024 for PlayStation 5, Windows, and Xbox Series X/S. Versions for PlayStation 4 and Nintendo Switch were announced on 2 October 2024, and released on 16 October.

== Reception ==
Reception

Aggregate scores
Aggregator	Score
Metacritic	(NS) 81/100 (PC) 84/100 (PS5) 82/100 (XSXS) 80/100
OpenCritic	89% recommend (Note: Based on 66 reviews)

Review scores
Publication	Score
Eurogamer	4/5
Famitsu	7/10, 8/10, 7/10, 8/10
Game Informer	8/10
GameSpot	8/10
GamesRadar+	4/5
Hardcore Gamer	4/5
Nintendo Life	8/10
Nintendo World Report	8.5/10
PC Gamer (US)	77/100
Push Square	8/10
The Guardian	5/5

Crow Country received "generally favorable" reviews, according to review aggregator website Metacritic. Review aggregator OpenCritic reported that 89% of critics recommended the game.

Critics praised the game's presentation and design as evocative of 1990s horror games. Daniel Bueno of Siliconera called the game "a true-to-form classic survival horror adventure", highlighting the setting and visual direction. Graham Banas of Push Square praised the game's "impressive amount of density and detail" in the environments, and its "wonderful retro graphical style". Alice Bell of Rock Paper Shotgun described the game's setting as "fantastic" and "sinister". Wes Fenlon of PC Gamer praised the game's effective jump scares and variety of "demented monster designs". Conversely, Leon Hurley of GamesRadar critiqued Mara's "blocky toy shape" and deemed the enemies "cartoonish". The soundtrack was also positively received, with critics finding that it added to the tense and ominous atmosphere.

The narrative and writing were well-received. Sarah Maria Griffin of The Guardian described the game's story as more complete and richer than anticipated, highlighting the "levity and playfulness" of its tone as well as the "bold" ending. Similarly, Fenlon enjoyed the writing's "cheeky nods to game and horror tropes". Hurley commended the game's "well-written characters and plotting", calling the story "rewarding" and that it captured a "feeling of surprise and uncertainty" found in older horror games. Bueno applauded the game's effective use of environmental storytelling to reveal lore about the park's history. Marcus Stewart of Game Informer praised the narrative for telling a "dark and generally enjoyable mystery" with a good sense of humor.

Reviewers expressed mixed views on the implementation of puzzles and gameplay mechanics. Hurley considered most of the game's puzzles to be satisfying to solve as they were self-contained and balanced in difficulty, but found some to have unclear solutions. Stewart wrote that the puzzles were "clever and well-designed", but that sorting through the large number of notes and hints was challenging. Bell praised the design of the puzzles for relying on player observation and intuition, but opined that the combat and survival horror aspects lacked a sense of threat and were easy to manage. Fenlon described the game as "too easy", calling the combat simple and the puzzles unmemorable.

=== Sales ===
Crow Country surpassed 100,000 copies sold by October 2024, with the majority of sales on the distribution service Steam and additional purchases on PlayStation 5, Xbox Series X/S, Nintendo Switch, and PlayStation 4. The release on Nintendo Switch significantly contributed to reaching this milestone. SFB Games indicated that they had no plans for additional content or releases on other platforms, as the studio was shifting focus toward future projects.

=== Awards ===
Year	Ceremony	Category	Result	Ref.
2024	Golden Joystick Awards	Best Indie Game - Self-Published	Nominated	
2025	Independent Games Festival	Excellence in Visual Arts	Honorable mention	
