= The Sexy Brutale =

2017 video game

- Developers: Cavalier Game Studios; Tequila Works
- Publishers: Tequila Works; Cavalier Game Studios
- Directors: Charles Griffiths; Tom Lansdale; James Griffiths
- Producers: James Griffiths; Miguel Paniagu Rubio
- Designer: Charles Griffiths
- Programmer: Tom Lansdale
- Artist: Elías Miguel Sánchez López
- Writer: James Griffiths
- Composers: Matt Bonham; Tim Cotterell
- Engine: Unity
- Platforms: PlayStation 4; Windows; Xbox One; Nintendo Switch; Amazon Luna
- Release: PS4, Windows, Xbox One; 12 April 2017; Switch; 7 December 2017; Amazon Luna; 20 October 2020
- Genres: Adventure, puzzle
- Mode: Single-player

The Sexy Brutale is an adventure puzzle video game developed by Cavalier Game Studios and Tequila Works. The game was released for PlayStation 4, Windows, and Xbox One in April 2017. A Nintendo Switch version was released in December 2017. A cloud-based version was released for Amazon Luna in October 2020. Set in a masked ball inside the titular casino-mansion, the player controls a masked preacher stuck in a time loop who must save the guests from the murderous mansion staff.

== Gameplay ==
The Sexy Brutale is an adventure puzzle video game. The player is tasked with exploring a mansion that is stuck in a time loop and saving its guests before they are killed off.

== Plot ==
Lafcadio Boone, a preacher, wakes up during the yearly party that Lucas Bondes hosts in his casino mansion. A mysterious woman, called the Bloody Girl, has given Boone a mask that has ripped him out of an ongoing time loop that the rest of the other party members are stuck in over a 12-hour period, reliving their deaths over and over again. She has also given Boone a broken watch, that when the timer reaches the hour of 5, the day resets. Boone's task is to save the other party goers from their gruesome deaths before they happen by learning different ways over the 12 hour period by discovering clues, recipes, or items. The first man he saves, Sixpence, takes the watch and fixes it so that the full 12 hours of the day become available. Boone then sets out to prevent the other deaths. Upon saving these other party goers, they remove their masks, talk to Boone to show they know him in some way. Boone then takes each mask, absorbing the powers they hold and giving him the means to save the other members and advance in the mansion.

After several party-goers have been saved, The Gold Skull, a man in a golden skull mask seemingly content on letting the actions play out, reveals himself as the instigator of the time loop. He reveals that the deaths that Boone has been preventing over the course of the 12 hour time loop, were created by himself as a means to punish Bondes. It turns out that Lucas was not making enough money from the mansion due to the large upkeep costs it required. Because of this, Lucas turned to insurance scheme to raise the money so he could live a normal life with his pregnant wife, Eleanor. To do so, he devised a plan to use timed firebombs placed in the mansion's connected fire pits, where they would explode at 12 a.m. the day after the party, when all the guests would be safely outside. This would make it seem like the mansion was destroyed by fire, thus obtaining the insurance money. However, the bombs exploded at 4 p.m. on the day of the party, killing all the guests, including Lucas's wife.

Golden Skull gives Lafcadio the chance to save Lucas, and he does so by cutting the wires of the last bomb that Lucas was handling in his study. It is then revealed that both Gold Skull, Lafcadio and even the staff are aspects of Lucas Bondes at different stages of his life after the incident. Having been the only survivor of the tragedy at the mansion (after jumping out of a window to escape the fire), he was taken to the hospital and later imprisoned for his crimes. But even after 40 years, he has not stopped blaming himself for what happened. The player can choose to either relive the time loop, resulting in replaying the final scenes again, or for Lucas to forgive himself and move on, still remembering his friends and wife, but living without that unnecessary pain, thus ending the game.

A secret ending can be acquired by collecting a deck of 52 cards scattered through the game and giving them to a demon at a hidden 'Old Habits' room of the casino. Doing so results in the casino going back to normal with the members alive. The player then approaches a decorated window and shatters it, bringing the party to a halt.

== Development and release ==
The Sexy Brutale was developed collaboratively by UK-based studio Cavalier Game Studios and Spain-based studio Tequila Works. Cavalier Game Studios was founded in 2013 by several former members of video game developers Lionhead Studios and Mediatonic. They began work on The Sexy Brutale which was inspired by the film Groundhog Day (1993) and games such as Moon: Remix RPG Adventure (1997), The Legend of Zelda: Majora's Mask (2000), and Gregory Horror Show (2003), which featured time loops. After working on the game for around 2 years, Cavalier enlisted Tequila Works to assist them on the game's art and graphics. Despite its title, The Sexy Brutale has no significant sexual content.

The Sexy Brutale launched for PlayStation 4, Windows, and Xbox One on 12 April 2017. The game was released for Nintendo Switch on 7 December 2017, and for Amazon Luna on 20 October 2020.

== Reception ==
Reception

Aggregate score
Aggregator	Score
Metacritic	(PC) 83/100 (PS4) 77/100 (XONE) 82/100 (NS) 71/100

Review scores
Publication	Score
Adventure Gamers	4/5 stars
Destructoid	8/10
Eurogamer	Recommended
Game Informer	7.75/10
GameSpot	8/10
Hardcore Gamer	4.5/5
IGN	8.2/10
Nintendo Life	(NS)
Nintendo World Report	(NS) 6.5/10
PC Gamer (US)	82/100
Push Square	9/10 stars
VideoGamer.com	8/10

The Sexy Brutale received "generally favourable" reviews from professional critics according to review aggregator website Metacritic. Justin McElroy of Polygon named The Sexy Brutale as his favorite game of 2017 praising the subtle storytelling and puzzle mechanics. The same website ranked the game 45th on their list of the 50 best games of 2017, while EGMNow ranked the game 18th in their list of the 25 Best Games of 2017. It was also nominated for "Best Setting" in PC Gamer's 2017 Game of the Year Awards, and for "Best Puzzle Game" in IGN's Best of 2017 Awards. In addition, it was nominated for "Animation", "Music Design", and "Best Writing" at the 2017 Develop Awards; for "Game by a Small Studio", "Puzzle Game", and the "Creativity and Heritage Award" at The Independent Game Developers' Association Awards 2017; for "Game Engineering" and "Game, Original Adventure" at the 17th Annual National Academy of Video Game Trade Reviewers Awards; and for "British Game" and "Debut Game" at the 14th British Academy Games Awards.
