= Night in the Woods =

2017 video game

- Digital storefront artwork
- Developers: Infinite Fall; Secret Lab
- Publisher: Finji
- Designers: Alec Holowka; Scott Benson; Bethany Hockenberry
- Programmers: Alec Holowka; Jon Manning; Paris Buttfield-Addison
- Artists: Scott Benson; Charles Huettner; Sven Ruthner
- Writers: Bethany Hockenberry; Scott Benson
- Composers: Alec Holowka; Scott Benson
- Engine: Unity
- Platforms: Linux; macOS; Windows; PlayStation 4; Xbox One; Nintendo Switch; iOS
- Release: February 21, 2017: Linux, macOS, Windows; NA: February 21, 2017; EU: February 28, 2017; JP: April 1, 2019 PS4; NA: February 21, 2017; EU: February 28, 2017; JP: March 28, 2019 Xbox One; WW: December 13, 2017 Switch; WW: February 1, 2018; JP: March 28, 2019 iOS; WW: September 9, 2021
- Genre: Adventure
- Mode: Single-player

Night in the Woods is a 2017 single-player adventure video game developed by Infinite Fall and Secret Lab and published by Finji. Set in a world of zoomorphic humans, the story follows a young woman named Mae, who drops out of college and returns to her hometown to find unexpected changes. The game was funded via Kickstarter, where it earned over four times its initial US$50,000 funding goal.

Prior to the release of Night in the Woods, a companion game titled Longest Night was released in December 2013 by Holowka and Benson, along with co-writer Bethany Hockenberry. In December 2014, a second supplemental game was released, titled Lost Constellation.

The game was released on February 21, 2017, for Microsoft Windows, Mac, Linux, and PlayStation 4, after a pushed-back original release date of January 10. The Xbox One version was released on December 13, 2017. An extended version of the game, titled the Weird Autumn edition, was released for Windows, Mac, Linux, PlayStation 4, and Xbox One on December 13, 2017, and also for Nintendo Switch on February 1, 2018. It features new content not seen in the first release, as well as the supplemental games. A version for iOS was released later on September 9, 2021.

Night in the Woods received critical praise for the soundtrack, story, dialogue, and characters.

== Overview and gameplay ==
Night in the Woods takes place in Possum Springs, a town populated by zoomorphic humans. The player takes the role of Mae, a young cat that has returned to Possum Springs after dropping out of college. Now living in her parents' attic, she discovers how much times have changed since the closing of the town's coal mines. She is forced to confront a horrible secret the town has hidden for decades involving not only the town's mine, but also the recent disappearance of her longtime friend Casey. Mae's friends also include Bea, a cigarette-smoking crocodile and Mae's childhood friend; Gregg, a hyperactive fox; and his boyfriend, a bear named Angus. Paste magazine describes the themes covered as "mental illness, depression, the stagnancy of the middle and lower classes, and the slow death of small town America."

Scott Benson described the key actions for the player as "explore, converse, see and touch", while Alec Holowka described their approach as "narrative-focused" rather than "gameplay-first". Players make decisions that affect the course of the story, though Benson said, "it's more like 'do you hang out with this person?' Okay, cool. That person might not know you as well by the end of the game, but this person you hung out with, you're going to get to see their storyline."

== Plot ==
Margaret "Mae" Borowski is a 20-year-old college dropout, who relocates back to her Rust Belt-inspired hometown of Possum Springs, where the closure of local coal mines years before the start of the game has led to visible economic stagnation. She meets up with her old friends, including gloomy but intelligent Beatrice "Bea" Santello, hyperactive delinquent Greggory "Gregg" Lee, and his quiet, sensible boyfriend Angus Delaney. Mae also learns that another one of her old friends, Casey Hartley, has mysteriously disappeared.

Mae spends about two weeks, between late October to early November exploring Possum Springs and hanging out with her friends, but she also begins to have strange and vivid dreams. At the town's autumn "Harfest" (Halloween) festival, she witnesses a teenager being kidnapped by a mysterious figure, who Mae believes is a ghost; her friends are skeptical. The four (and Germ, another friend of Mae) hesitantly work together to figure out the goings-on, as Mae's mental health slowly deteriorates with each dream. After intensive investigation, the friends come across a mysterious group of cloaked figures in the woods, who give chase; Mae falls down a cliff and lapses into a coma, while her friends manage to escape.

Mae is rescued by churchgoers, then eventually wakes up and returns to her friends, where she reveals that she dropped out due to her increasing dissociation from people and the world, seeing everything as shapes. Mae's journal, in which she draws pictures for various in-game events, was given to her by the town doctor to write down her emotions after she bludgeoned a student with a softball bat during a dissociative episode six years prior to the game's events. This incident caused the townsfolk to become wary of Mae and imposed a financial and emotional strain on her family. Mae's dissociation worsened at college, so she chose to return home, hoping that being in a familiar place would help her return to normal.

Still wounded, Mae ventures out into the woods to find the hooded group, only for Gregg, Bea, and Angus to arrive, refusing to let her go alone. The group enters the old mines and confronts the mysterious cult that has been kidnapping people deemed unlikely to be missed, including their missing friend Casey, to sacrifice them to a god-like chthonic entity called the Black Goat in the hope that it will revitalize the economy of Possum Springs. The cult's leader allows the group to leave, threatening them never to tell anyone about the cult, but as the group exits the mine elevator, a cultist ambushes them and attacks Mae. The others manage to save her and the elevator falls, collapsing the mine and presumably trapping the cult underground.

The next day, depending on whom the player interacted with the most throughout the course of the game, Mae sits down with either Bea or Gregg and discusses the events of the previous night, and all the happenings in Possum Springs. The others join them shortly after, and Mae learns that although they will all be forced to grow and adapt to life, for better or for worse, they can still enjoy their time together now. The game ends with the four deciding to forget about their problems for the time being and have band practice.

== Development ==
Prior to the release of Night in the Woods, a companion game titled Longest Night was released in December 2013 by Holowka and Benson, along with co-writer Bethany Hockenberry. In December 2014, a second supplemental game was released, titled Lost Constellation.

Night in the Woods was announced on October 22, 2013, via Kickstarter. Holowka and Benson set a US$50,000 funding goal, which was reached in only 26 hours. The project eventually earned over US$200,000 in crowdfunding. The additional funding allowed Infinite Fall to hire animator Charles Huettner to create additional animations, and for Infinite Ammo and game developer Adam Saltsman to create a roguelike that is playable within Night in the Woods. While Benson believed adding further stretch goals would result in additional backers, Infinite Fall limited the number of stretch goals to avoid scope creep. Benson names Chris Ware, Mike Mignola, Mary Blair, Flannery O'Connor, and Richard Scarry as influences on his work on Night in the Woods. He later stated the name was taken from the first song in The World/Inferno Friendship Society's album The Bridgewater Astral League, which influenced certain themes in the game, as well.

In October 2017, it was announced that the game would be ported to iOS devices by Australian studio Secret Lab, who created the narrative engine used by the game. The port was tentatively due for release in 2018, but released on September 9, 2021. In January 2018, the game was officially announced for the Nintendo Switch, and was released for the console the following month, including all content from the Weird Autumn edition. A physical version was planned to be released through Limited Run Games, but was delayed indefinitely after the rest of the development team cut their ties with Holowka, following accusations of physical and emotional abuse by Holowka's ex-partner Zoë Quinn. Five years after the game's release, Limited Run Games would officially start accepting preorders for the physical version starting December 18, 2022 and lasting until January 29, 2023. The collector's edition includes the game, the soundtracks for both the main game and Demon Tower on CD, acrylic stands, a coin, a physical version of Mae's journal, a planisphere, glow-in-the-dark cards and sticker sheets.

=== Soundtrack ===
Alec Holowka created the soundtrack for Night in the Woods, with Scott Benson contributing to select tracks as well. Three albums of the game's music were released via Bandcamp on March 9, 2017. Holowka named DIIV as a large influence on the game's score.

== Reception ==
Reception

Aggregate scores
Aggregator	Score
Metacritic	PC: 88/100; PS4: 87/100; XONE: 75/100; NS: 85/100
OpenCritic	86/100; 91% Critics Recommend

Review scores
Publication	Score
Destructoid	9.5/10
Game Informer	8.8/10
GameSpot	9/10
IGN	8.7/10
Nintendo Life	9/10
PC Gamer (US)	8.2/10
Polygon	7.5/10
Push Square	9/10

Night in the Woods received very favourable reviews. On Metacritic, the PS4 version has an average score of 87 from 15 critics, and the PC version has an average score of 88 from 30 critics. Praise is mainly given to the writing and characters. In Japan, where the PlayStation 4 and Switch versions were ported and published by Playism on March 28, 2019, Famitsu gave them each a score of one nine and three eights for a total of 33 out of 40.

Eurogamer ranked the game 13th on their list of the "Top 50 Games of 2017", and GamesRadar+ ranked it 17th on their list of the 25 Best Games of 2017, while Polygon ranked it 23rd on their list of the 50 best games of 2017. The game was nominated for "Best Comedy Game" in PC Gamer's 2017 Game of the Year Awards. It won the award for "Best Adventure Game" in IGN's Best of 2017 Awards, whereas its other nominations were for "Best Art Direction", "Best Story", and "Best Original Music". In Giant Bomb's 2017 Game of the Year Awards, the game won the award for "Best Cast of Characters", and was a runner-up each for "Best Debut", "Best Story", and "Game of the Year". It also won the award for "Best Character" (Mae) and "Best Dialogue" in Game Informer's 2017 Adventure Game of the Year Awards. Before that, the game won the award "Best 2D Visuals" and the overall award "Golden Cube" in the Unity Awards 2017, whereas it was nominated for "Best Desktop/Console Game".

=== Awards ===
Year	Award	Category	Result	Ref.
2017	SXSW Gamer's Voice Awards 2017	Gamer's Voice (Single Player)	Nominated	
2017	Golden Joystick Awards	Best Storytelling	Nominated	
2017	Golden Joystick Awards	Best Visual Design	Nominated	
2017	Golden Joystick Awards	Best Indie Game	Nominated	
2017	Golden Joystick Awards	Breakthrough Award (Infinite Fall)	Nominated	
2017	The Game Awards 2017	Games for Impact	Nominated	
2017	The Game Awards 2017	Best Independent Game	Nominated	
2017	Titanium Awards	Best Indie Game	Nominated	
2018	21st Annual D.I.C.E. Awards	D.I.C.E. Sprite Award	Nominated	
2018	21st Annual D.I.C.E. Awards	Outstanding Achievement in Story	Nominated	
2018	National Academy of Video Game Trade Reviewers Awards	Art Direction, Contemporary	Nominated	
2018	National Academy of Video Game Trade Reviewers Awards	Writing in a Comedy	Won	
2018	SXSW Gaming Awards 2018	Most Promising Intellectual New Property	Nominated	
2018	SXSW Gaming Awards 2018	Most Fulfilling Community-Funded Game	Won	
2018	SXSW Gaming Awards 2018	Excellence in Narrative	Nominated	
2018	SXSW Gaming Awards 2018	Matthew Crump Cultural Innovation Award	Nominated	
2018	SXSW Gaming Awards 2018	Trending Game of the Year	Nominated	
2018	Independent Games Festival Competition Awards	Seumas McNally Grand Prize	Won	
2018	Independent Games Festival Competition Awards	Excellence in Visual Art	Nominated	
2018	Independent Games Festival Competition Awards	Excellence in Narrative	Won	
2018	Game Developers Choice Awards	Best Debut (Infinite Fall)	Nominated	
2018	Game Developers Choice Awards	Best Narrative	Nominated	
2018	Game Developers Choice Awards	Best Visual Art	Nominated	
2018	14th British Academy Games Awards	Debut Game	Nominated	
2018	14th British Academy Games Awards	Game Beyond Entertainment	Nominated	
2018	14th British Academy Games Awards	Narrative	Won	
2018	14th British Academy Games Awards	Original Property	Nominated	

== Legacy ==
Penelope Scott's 2020 song "Rät" references the game in its lyrics, specifically Selmers' dream of leaving Possum Springs and burning down Silicon Valley.

In June 2022, during a Portland Timbers Major League Soccer (MLS) match against Houston Dynamo FC, the team's supporters displayed a Night in the Woods-themed tifo depicting Mae with an axe, reading "From Stonewall a brick and Portland an axe, respect our pride or expect our wrath". The developers have stated that Mae's character is pansexual. In a tweet in reaction to the banner, Scott Benson stated that he endorsed the message and that his "jaw dropped" upon seeing it.

== Related media ==
In May 2023, Revenant Hill was announced by The Glory Society, a cooperative game development studio that included Benson and Hockenberry. The game featured a similar art style and gameplay to Night in the Woods, but was a standalone project. In November 2023, the studio closed down and the game was canceled due to the lead developer, Scott Benson, developing severe heart disease. The illness also led to the Glory Society suspending operations.
