= Detective Grimoire: Secret of the Swamp =

2014 video game

Detective Grimoire
- Promotional art for Detective Grimoire
- Developer: SFB Games
- Publisher: Armor Games
- Platforms: iOS; Android; Windows; Mac; Linux
- Release: January 2, 2014
- Genre: Adventure game

Detective Grimoire: Secret of the Swamp, also simply called Detective Grimoire, is a murder mystery point-and-click adventure game developed by SFB Games and published by Armor Games, which was released on iOS platforms on January 2, 2014. It was later released on Android, PC, Mac, Linux and Steam by SFB Games.

The game has been well received for its mystery, animation, dialogue and protagonist. It is intended to be the first game in a True Detective Grimoire franchise. A sequel, Tangle Tower, was released in 2019. However it was predated by a flash game release of the same name in 2007.

== Gameplay ==
The game puts players in the role of Detective Grimoire, who comes to a tourist attraction in the swamp where a mysterious creature is the suspect of a murder. The player must go around speaking with witnesses, searching the environment for evidence, and solving puzzles that hinder their progress. At the end of the game, the player must use all the evidence and testimonies they've gathered to determine who the true culprit is.

In addition to talking to suspects you must collect clues across the theme park and solve puzzles (to collect more clues), these clues usually are more important than clues you find lying around.

The game has a completion meter that you can access in the save file select.

== Development ==
Secret of the Swamp is a successor to the original Detective Grimoire flash game developed by SFB Games (formerly The Super Flash Bros.) and published by Armor Games on their website and Newgrounds in 2007. The game was crowdfunded on Kickstarter in July 2012, raising $29,611 USD. The game was followed by a sequel, Tangle Tower, which released for Apple Arcade, Nintendo Switch, and Microsoft Windows in 2019.

== Reception ==
Reception

Aggregate score
Aggregator	Score
Metacritic	iOS: 83/100

Review score
Publication	Score
TouchArcade	4/5

The iOS version has a Metacritic score of 83/100 based on 8 critics.

148Apps wrote "Great voice-acting, interesting gameplay, and top-notch animations set Detective Grimoire apart from the masses in a fantastic crime-solving adventure". Gamezebo commented "From the moment you set foot on the docks, Boggy’s Bog is engrossing, its characters alive and endearing, and its mystery simple—yet inescapably intriguing". Gamer.nl said "Atmospheric images, a filmic soundtrack and very strong acting make Detective Grimoire an experience for everyone. The game offers original and varied puzzles, intuitive controls and a play style that forces to exploring its beautiful world. Enchanting, challenging and interesting to the very end". Adventure Gamers wrote "Detective Grimoire breathes some new life into the investigation/visual novel subgenre with its compelling setting, characters and humour, undermined only by puzzles that are nowhere as enjoyable as the rest of the game", while Hyper Magazine described it as "beautifully presented". TouchArcade concluded "in this outing, however, Detective Grimoire is going to have to settle for being an enjoyable, though altogether too simple, ride", while AppSpy said "though it's a little short and a tad buggy, Detective Grimoire is an entertaining mystery that is elevated by it entertaining art, writing, and voice acting". Pocket Gamer wrote "Detective Grimoire goes a long way towards involving you in a funny, wacky cartoon murder mystery. But the case is not quite as complex as you might hope", while Hardcore Gamer Magazine said "For a game like this to have this bad of a mystery at its core should be absolutely unforgivable, but it presents itself with such charm and style that I find myself willing to forgive quite a lot. Not quite that much, but a lot more than I'd expected".
