= Gylt =

- Developer: Tequila Works
- Publisher: Tequila Works
- Director: David Canela
- Writer: Kevin Sardà
- Composer: Cris Velasco
- Platforms: Stadia; PlayStation 4; PlayStation 5; Windows; Xbox One; Xbox Series X/S; Nintendo Switch
- Release: Stadia; November 19, 2019; PlayStation 4, PlayStation 5, Xbox One, Xbox Series X/S, Windows; July 6, 2023; Nintendo Switch; March 14, 2024
- Genre: Survival horror
- Mode: Single-player

Gylt is a survival horror video game developed and published by Tequila Works. It was released on November 19, 2019 for Google Stadia. It was notable for being one of the few Stadia-exclusive titles, causing it to be temporarily unavailable for sale upon that platform's shutdown in 2023. It was released for PlayStation 4, PlayStation 5, Windows, Xbox One, and Xbox Series X/S on July 6, 2023. A port for Nintendo Switch was released on March 14, 2024. Gylt received mixed reviews from critics, who called it enjoyable and praised the graphics, but said that it lacked excitement.

== Gameplay ==
The gameplay revolves around sneaking past enemies while trying to escape the nightmare. Sally uses a flashlight as a weapon, although she later acquires a fire extinguisher as well. The game includes light elements of puzzles and combat.

== Plot ==
The game's main character is Sally Kauffman, a young girl who is trying to find her missing cousin, Emily, within the fictional mining town Bethelwood in the middle of Maine. She has been hanging posters of Emily around town. After school bullies cause her to crash her bike, she boards a cable car and enters a nightmare world full of monsters with dark parallels to her bullying. She finds Emily inside of their school Bachman, along with a mysterious old man named Charon who urges her to help Emily. Once Sally finds Emily, she expresses hatred towards Sally for not helping her in the past when she was bullied before being captured by a giant monster and taken to the mine. With Charon's help, Sally rescues Emily, who reconciles with her. As they return to the cable car station, pursued by a horde of monsters, Charon reveals that they each need a ticket in order to leave the nightmare world and they only have one, with not much time before the nightmare world apparently collapses and disappears.

At this point, the story may end with Sally choosing either to save herself and leave Emily behind or save Emily and remain behind, with the other girl left behind seemingly vanishing along with the nightmare world with no hope of being found again, which will result in either Sally continuing to hang posters of Emily despite knowing what happened to her or Emily returning to school while posters of Sally are now posted. However, if Sally rescued every imprisoned inhabitant in the nightmare world, Charon then realizes that these prisoners came from the real world and the scraps of paper they gave her can be crafted into a second ticket that would allow both girls to return to the real world, in what would be considered the true, best ending. Just before they escape in this ending, Emily gifts him her teddy bear, which survives the destruction of the nightmare world while Charon himself disappears.

== Reception ==
Reception

Aggregate score
Aggregator	Score
Metacritic	68/100

Review score
Publication	Score
Destructoid	7/10

The game received an aggregate score of 68/100 on Metacritic, indicating "mixed or average" reviews.

Chris Carter of Destructoid rated the game 7/10 points, calling it short, but mostly engaging. He called the story a "slow burn", while comparing the stealth mechanic to Metal Gear Solid, and remarked that using the flashlight as a weapon was a "cool" way to avoid using guns. Chris Shive of Hardcore Gamer rated the game 3/5 points, calling it an "enjoyable" game with a "Silent Hill vibe", but not a killer app. He praised the "cartoonish" character designs and "unnerving" soundtrack.

Vikki Blake of Eurogamer called the game surprisingly scary for something she initially thought was made for kids, saying that the game ran well on Stadia besides one crash. However, she criticized the game as being "linear and predictable", with a "lazy, frustrating" final boss.
