= Google Stadia =

Cloud gaming service

Stadia

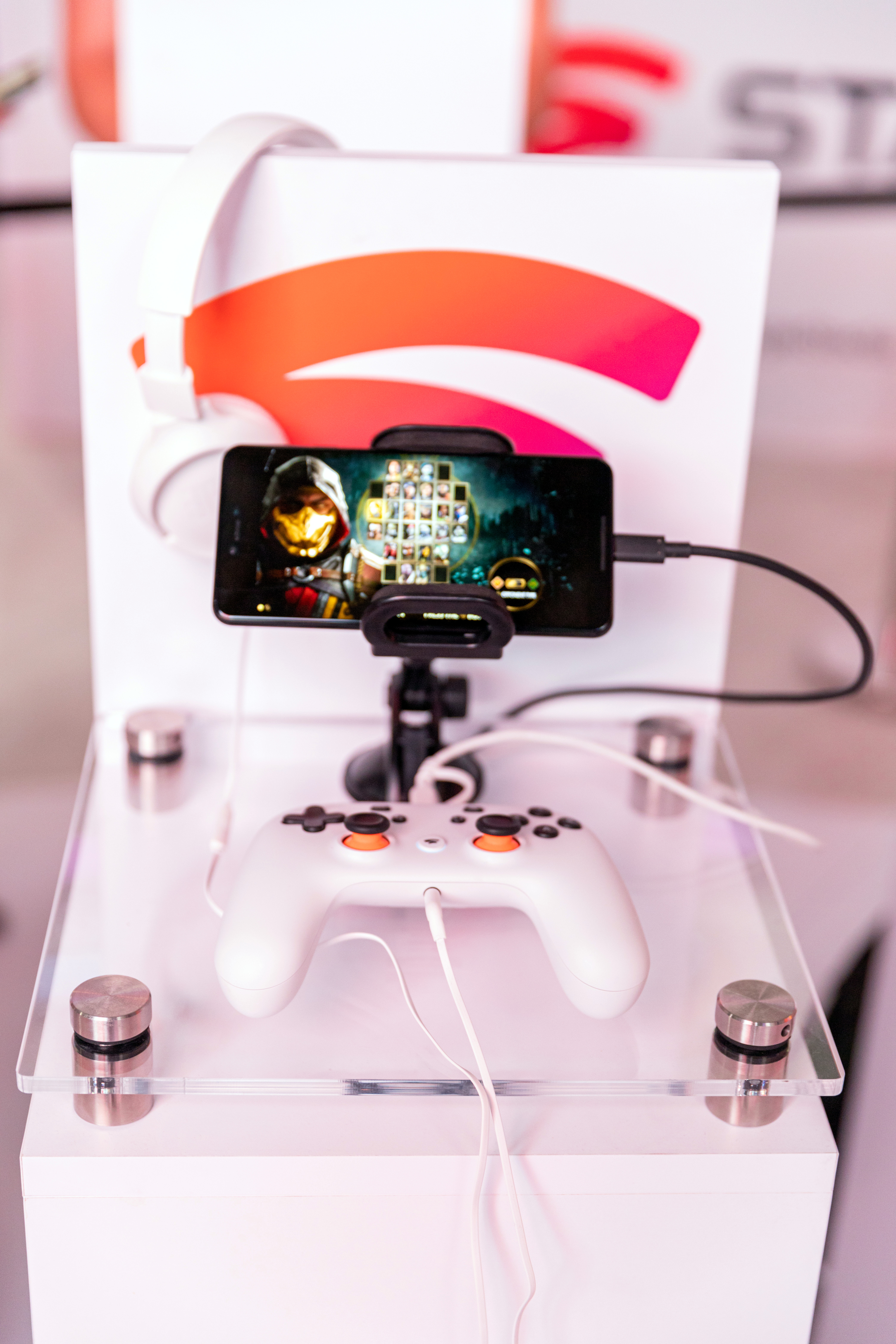
- Mobile device running Mortal Kombat 11 on Stadia with official controller
- Developer: Google
- Type: Cloud gaming service
- Launched: November 19, 2019
- Discontinued: January 18, 2023
- Operating system: Cross-platform
- Website: stadia.google.com

Stadia was a cloud gaming service developed and operated by Google. Known in development as Project Stream, the service debuted through a closed beta in October 2018, and publicly launched in November 2019. Stadia was accessible through Chromecast Ultra and Android TV devices, on personal computers via the Google Chrome web browser and other Chromium-based browsers, Chromebooks and tablets running ChromeOS, and the Stadia mobile app on supported Android devices. There was also an experimental mode with support for all Android devices that were capable of installing the Stadia mobile app. In December 2020, Google released an iOS browser-based progressive web application for Stadia, enabling gameplay in the Safari browser.

Stadia was capable of streaming video games to players from the company's numerous data centers at up to 4K resolution and 60 frames per second, with support for high-dynamic-range (HDR) video. It offered the option to purchase games from its store, along with a selection of free-to-play games. While the base service was free and allowed users to stream at resolutions up to 1080p, a Stadia Pro monthly subscription allowed for a maximum resolution of 4K, 5.1 surround sound, HDR, and offered a growing collection of free games that—once claimed—remained in the user's library whenever they had an active subscription. Both tiers allowed users to play online multiplayer games without any additional costs. Stadia was integrated with YouTube, and its "state share" feature allowed players to launch a supported game from a save state shared by another player via permalink. The service supported Google's proprietary Stadia game controller, along with various non-Stadia controllers through USB and Bluetooth connections.

The service was in competition with other cloud gaming services, including Sony's PlayStation Now cloud streaming, Nvidia's GeForce Now, Amazon's Luna, and Microsoft's Xbox Cloud Gaming. Stadia initially received a mixed reception from reviewers, with most criticism directed at its limited library of games and lack of promised features. Google had initially intended to develop in-house games in addition to hosting games produced by third parties, but abandoned this plan in February 2021, shutting down its studios. The service continued to sell third party games, and Google offered the game-streaming technology as a white-label product. Google announced in September 2022 that it would be shutting down Stadia; the service went offline permanently on January 18, 2023. Google refunded those that bought the hardware in the Google store and software in the Stadia store, and provided a software update to the Stadia controller to enable Bluetooth connectivity for use on computers, phones, tablets, and game consoles. The deadline of converting the Stadia controller on the website and Bluetooth support tool shut down and ended on December 31, 2025.

== Features ==
Stadia was a cloud gaming service, in which it requires an Internet connection and a device running either Chromium or a dedicated application. Stadia elaborated upon YouTube's capacity to stream media to the user, as game streaming was seen as an extension of watching video game live streams, according to Google's Phil Harrison; the name "Stadia", the Latin plural of "stadium", was meant to reflect that it was offering a collection of entertainment, which the viewer could choose to sit back and watch, or take an active part in. As Google had built out a large number of data centers across the globe, the company believed that Stadia was in a better position for cloud gaming compared to past endeavors like OnLive, PlayStation Now, and Gaikai, as most players would be geographically close to a data center. Players could start playing games without having to download new content to their personal device. Players could opt to record or stream their sessions on to YouTube without extra software or equipment. Viewers of such streams could launch their own instances of the games directly from the stream that they were just watching.

Stadia promised novel features based on its streaming model. Stream Connect would allow Stadia players, cooperatively playing the same game with friends, to have picture-in-picture inserts on their display of their friends' point-of-view in the game. This feature was first launched with the release of Tom Clancy's Ghost Recon Breakpoint. The streaming technology allowed for a larger number of concurrent players on a game server; for example, servers for Grid are normally limited to 16 players, while the Stadia version allowed up to 40.

While Stadia could use any HID-class USB controller, Google developed its own controller, which connected via the user's Wi-Fi directly to the Google data center in which the game was running, to reduce input latency. Google was also exploring further ways to reduce latency, involving the prediction of user input through various means, so that any apparent network lag between controller and game response was minimized. During its GDC 2019 keynote presentation, Google confirmed that the controller would also feature Google Assistant, which would automatically search YouTube for relevant, helpful videos related to the game the user was playing.

Stadia offered two tiers of service: a free level (initially at launch known as "Stadia Base" but after April 2020, simply "Stadia"), and a monthly subscription Stadia Pro level. The free Stadia level limited the video stream resolution to 1080p. The Pro tier, costing approximately US$10 per month, allowed users higher streaming rates, up to 4K resolution, access to a library of free games over time, and discounts on other games offered for Stadia.

Publisher-specific subscriptions would also be offered; for example, Ubisoft announced that its Uplay Plus (now renamed to Ubisoft+) subscription service would be available to Stadia users.

Since April 2020, new Stadia users were offered a limited introductory period of free access to Stadia Pro features, retaining access to any games purchased during this period if they fell back to the free Stadia level; initially, new users received two months of Pro access, which was reduced to one month starting on June 3, 2020.

The internet speed requirements for the different types of picture quality from Stadia's service were as follows:

Connectivity speeds for Stadia
Bandwidth required	Video quality	Audio quality
10 Mbit/s	720p, 60 FPS	Stereo
20 Mbit/s	1080p HDR Video, 60 FPS	5.1 Surround
35 Mbit/s	4K HDR Video, 60 FPS	5.1 Surround

=== Games ===
Stadia required users to purchase games to use on the service, though it also offered a selection of fully free-to-play titles. Pro subscribers also had the option to claim a growing catalog of free games that, once claimed, remained available to the user as long as they had an active subscription. At the time of the platform's unveiling in June 2019, Google announced that Gylt by Tequila Works and Get Packed by Moonshine Studios would be timed exclusives to Stadia. The service launched with 22 games, adding 4 more in December 2019, and by the end of 2020 the service had over 130 games.

In January 2020, Google announced that it planned to release over 120 games for Stadia during that year, of which 10 were timed exclusives set to release in the first half of the year. Further, Stadia claimed that more than 100 games would arrive in 2021. In December 2020, Ubisoft's gaming subscription, Ubisoft+ arrived on Stadia, letting users play all Ubisoft games available on Stadia. There were 18 Ubisoft games available at launch with later titles added as they released.

On January 13, 2023, five days before its closure, Stadia Platform Content released Worm Game, a simple variant of snake used internally to test features before the service's shutdown, as both its only first-party title and the final title released in the service, as a thank you gift for all Stadia players. The game consisted of a campaign mode consisting of a handful of levels in which players must move their snake to reach a golden apple, an endless high-score based arcade mode, a stage builder, and a multiplayer mode which let up to four people play together in high-score or deathmatch variants. Never intended for public release, it featured rudimentary graphics and menus, and plays a single chiptune-style audio track on loop.

=== Hardware ===
Upon launch, Stadia's cloud hardware used a custom Intel x86 processor clocked at 2.7 GHz, with AVX2 and 9.5 megabytes of L2+L3 cache. It had a custom AMD GPU based on the Vega architecture with HBM2 memory, 56 compute units, and 10.7 teraFLOPS. The service employed solid-state drive storage, and 16 GB of RAM (supporting up to 484 GB/s bandwidth) shared between the GPU and the CPU.

==== Controller ====
Stadia Controller
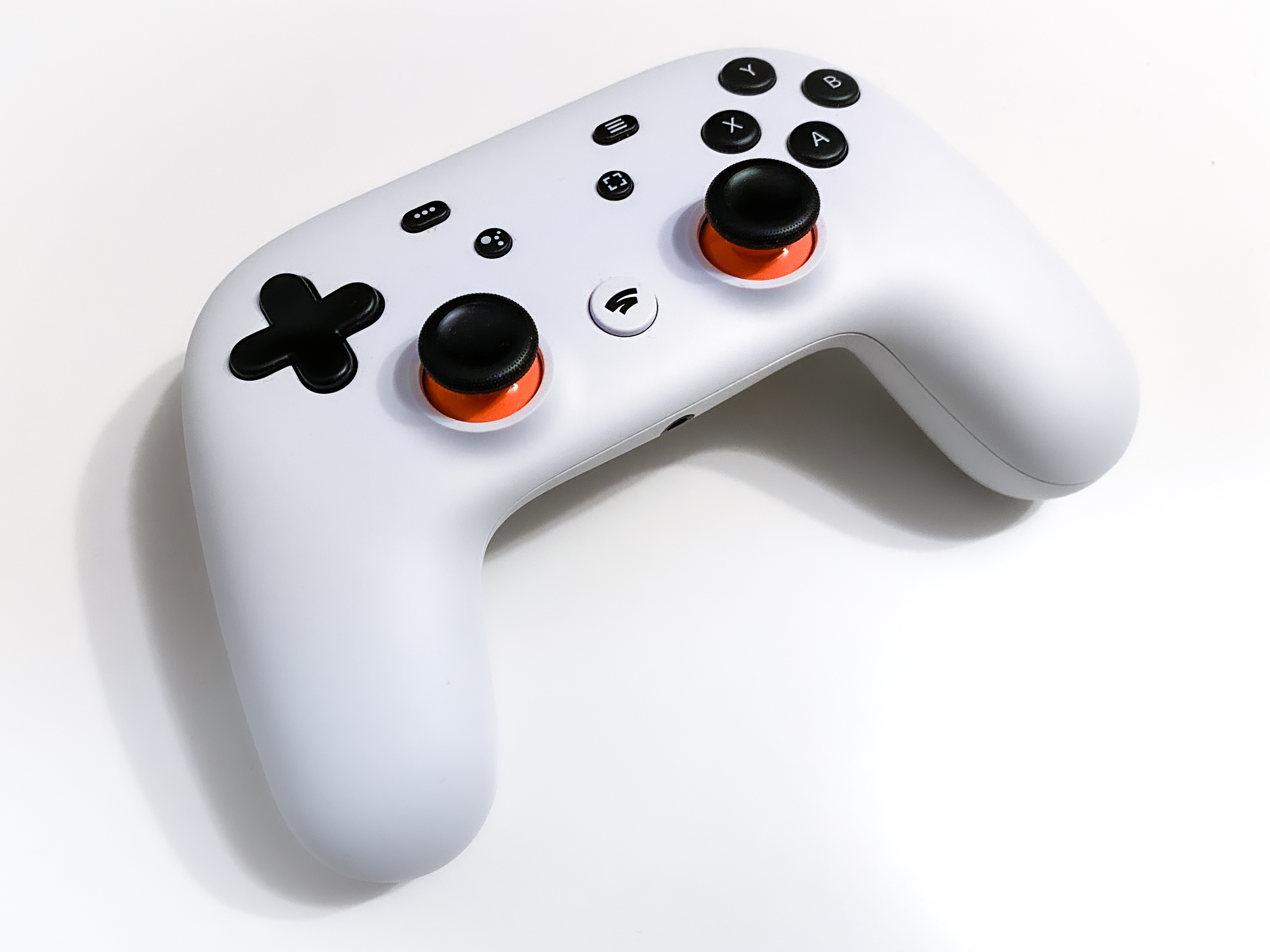
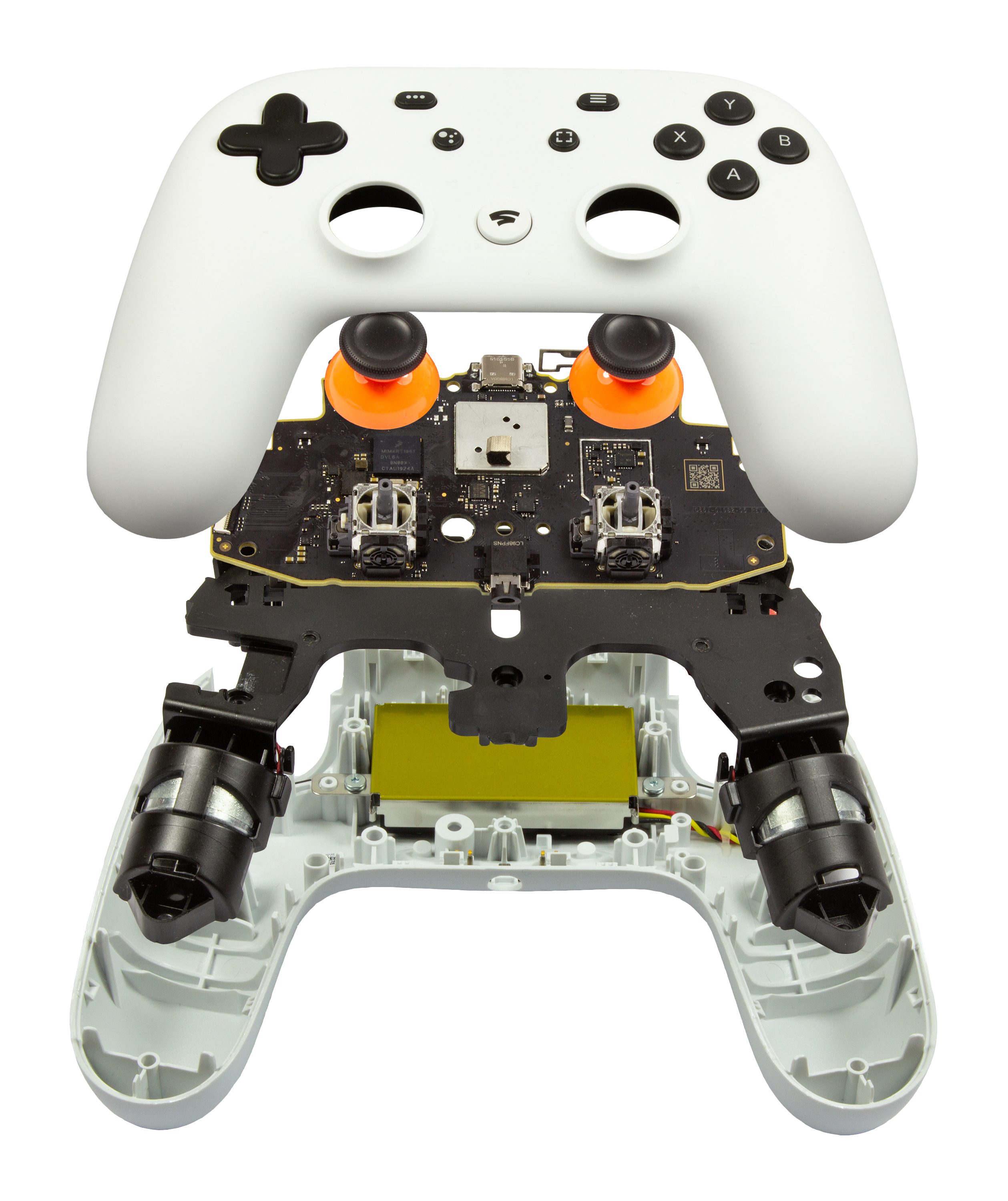
- Manufacturer: Google
- Type: Video game controller
- Released: November 19, 2019
- Input: 2× analog sticks; 2× analog triggers (L2, R2); 2× shoulder buttons (L1, R1); 9× digital buttons (Y, B, A, X, Menu, Options, Capture, Google Assistant, Stadia); Digital D-Pad
- Connectivity: Wi-Fi, USB-C, Bluetooth

Google developed its own controller for Stadia. It has two thumbsticks, a directional pad, four main face buttons, two sets of shoulder buttons, and five additional controller face buttons. To use the controller, players could either plug it into a compatible device with a USB cable, or connect it over Wi-Fi to a local network for a direct connection to Google's Stadia servers, reducing input lag. The controller was available in three color schemes, "Clearly White", "Just Black", and "Wasabi"; the "Founder's Edition" bundle included a limited-edition "Midnight Blue" controller.

Google produced prototypes in several other colours, and transparent versions of the controller were given as gifts to people who worked on Stadia.

While the Stadia controller does have a Bluetooth Low Energy radio, this was initially disabled. Google released a web-based tool on January 17, 2023, to enable Bluetooth on the controller, allowing it to be used with computers and other devices just before and after the shutdown of Stadia. The deadline for converting the controller from WiFi to Bluetooth was planned to end on December 31, 2023, before being extended to December 31, 2024, and then finally to December 31, 2025.

=== Software ===
Stadia was built on Linux servers with the Vulkan graphics API.

"This [Stadia] starts with our platform foundations of Linux and Vulkan and shows in our selection of GPUs that have open-source drivers and tools. We're integrating LLVM and DirectX Shader Compiler to ensure you get great features and performance from our compilers and debuggers."

— Dov Zimring, Stadia Developer Platform Lead

A progressive web application–based version of Stadia for iOS devices was announced by Google in November 2020 and released on December 16, 2020. It ran in Chrome or Safari web browsers, to avoid restrictions Apple had in place for apps that directly stream libraries of games. This browser-based approach had been similarly adapted by GeForce Now.

At the 2021 Consumer Electronics Show, Google announced that several upcoming LG smart televisions would include a Stadia Smart TV app.

== History and development ==
=== Launch and studio expansions (2018–2020) ===
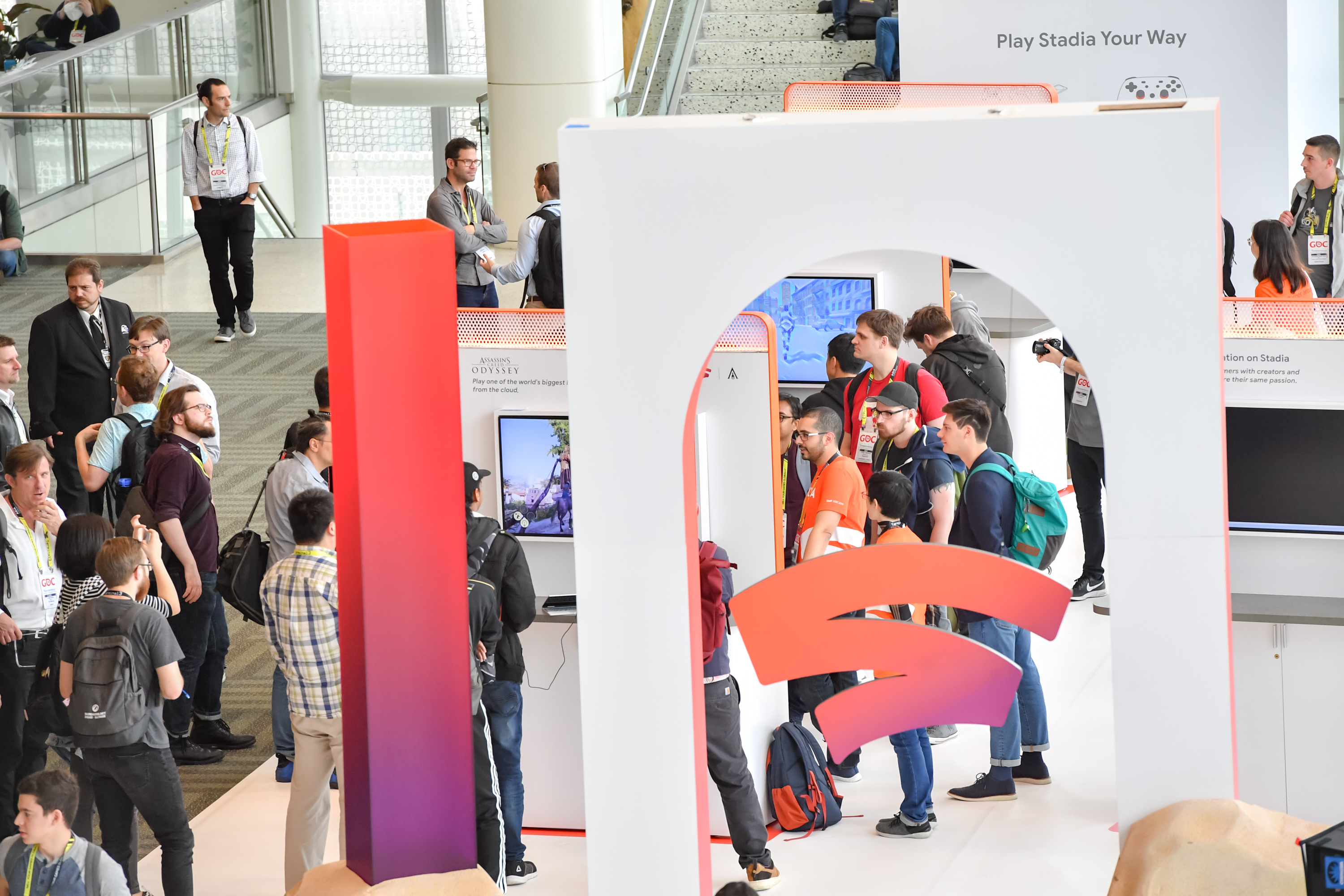
Stadia booth at the 2019 Game Developers Conference

Project Stream was Google's first announced sign of interest in video gaming products. The company had previously been rumored as working on a service called Project Yeti since at least 2016. Google had also hired gaming industry executive Phil Harrison and was seen recruiting developers during industry events in 2018. Project Stream's main differentiator from past services, such as OnLive, GeForce Now, and PlayStation Now, was its ability to run in any desktop Chrome browser, so no additional software needed to be installed. The service used AMD Radeon graphics hardware. Internally, the service was developed around 2016's Doom to show that the proof-of-concept worked in realistic settings across the public internet.

Google announced the service in October 2018 and, soon after, opened invitations to beta testers with access to Assassin's Creed Odyssey. Players could apply for access and those who met an Internet speed minimum could run the game in their Chrome browsers. Those who participated received a free copy of the game on Ubisoft Connect when the beta expired. Stadia was formally announced during Google's keynote address at the 2019 Game Developers Conference in March 2019.

Alongside Stadia, Google established the Stadia Games and Entertainment division in March 2019, with industry veteran Jade Raymond as its head. This division focused on internal development of games specifically for Stadia. The first studio was established in Montreal on October 24, 2019. In December 2019, the Stadia Games and Entertainment division acquired Typhoon Studios to develop additional content for the platform. A second Stadia studio, located in Playa Vista, Los Angeles, was opened in March 2020, led by former Santa Monica Studio head Shannon Studstill.

=== Strategy change and shutdown (2021–2023) ===
==== Closure of Stadia Games and Entertainment ====
Google shut down Stadia Games and Entertainment on February 1, 2021. This decision also caused the closure of Typhoon Studios. The announcement came after the decisions were made about Stadia's priorities for game development and delivery. Harrison stated that the decision would focus on making the platform more amenable as a publishing platform for third-party developers, stating, "We believe this is the best path to building Stadia into a long-term, sustainable business that helps grow the industry." The shutdown affected about 150 employees, including Raymond, who left Google that day. Sean Hollister of The Verge wondered if the shutdown were provoked by poor sales of Cyberpunk 2077 on Stadia, in a "make-or-break moment for the service", while Kotaku writers reported that Google's decision to close the studios followed after Microsoft announced their intended acquisition of ZeniMax Media for Xbox Game Studios in September 2020.

Reports from Bloomberg News and Wired, based on information from people who worked on Stadia, said that, for Google, game development was an unusual concept, in contrast to building out the technology to operate Stadia, and had never had the full support of the company. Further, under Harrison's leadership, despite millions of dollars spent to get major titles on the service, like Red Dead Redemption 2, and to recruit Jade Raymond to develop exclusive content, Stadia had missed target user counts and revenues by a significant amount, contributing to Google's decision to close down its studios. The founders of Typhoon Studio agreed that Google did not have either the financial or corporate backing to bring the "level of investment required to reach scale" expected for high-end game development, with Google seeing that area as too much of a risk. Video Games Chronicle also reported that several planned games for the service were cancelled leading up to the closure of the studios. These included a sequel to Typhoon Studios's Journey to the Savage Planet, planned projects led by Hideo Kojima and Yu Suzuki, and a large multiplayer title led by Francois Pelland, a former Assassin's Creed developer, and left in limbo a near-finalized game from Harmonix which Harmonix says may still be released. Axios later reported that The Quarry by Supermassive Games and High on Life by Squanch Games were also both originally being developed for the service prior to the shutdown of the studios. The former would eventually be picked up by publisher 2K, and the latter was eventually self-published by Squanch. The shutdown, Hollister suggested, was a change of direction for Stadia toward a white-label platform that Google could license out to game publishers for things like instant game demos. This was something that Nvidia had done with its GeForce streaming solutions.

In May 2021, at least six lead people for Stadia left Google, including John Justice, the vice-president of Stadia for Google; Sebastien Puel, Stadia Games & Entertainment's Montreal studio manager; and Corey May, Stadia Games & Entertainment's head of creative services and publishing. The latter two joined Raymond at her new studio, Haven, further putting the future of Stadia in question. During the Epic Games v. Apple trial, Epic's CEO Tim Sweeney stated that Stadia had been "very significantly scaled back" since its launch. Google stated in wake of these events that Stadia was "alive and well" with significant plans for expansion in 2021.

To draw more developers to the platform, Stadia announced a new revenue sharing program in July 2021. Through 2023, Stadia would take only a 15% cut of a game's revenue on the platform, up to $3 million. After that, their cut would return to their standard rate, believed to have been near the industry-wide 30% average, under what Google called "competitive revenue share terms". Further, Stadia would share 70% of Stadia Pro membership fees with games that entered the service starting in July 2021, the share split based on hours played by Stadia users. Additionally, in an affiliate marketing scheme, Stadia would pay the first month of a new Stadia Pro membership fee to any developer who drew a new user to the service. The former members of Typhoon Games were able to secure funding, including some from Tencent, to launch a new studio Raccoon Logic, and through negotiations with Google retained the rights to Journey to the Savage Planet and its in-progress sequel.

Google began licensing out Stadia's technology as a white-label product in October 2021, branded as "Immersive Stream for Games", which was intended to be expanded to other business solutions by Google. One of the first instances using this product was an offer for AT&T customers to play a Stadia-enabled version of Batman: Arkham Knight for free. Another early example was Capcom's use of the Stadia technology to offer a free demo of Resident Evil Village in June 2022 through any web browser. In December 2021, it was announced that Stadia had been ported to LG televisions running WebOS 5.0 or later. On February 4, 2022, Business Insider reported that Google intended to shift its focus on Stadia from video games to playable experiences and online demos, as Stadia had been "demoted". That same day, Google announced on Twitter that Stadia would have 100 more games coming to the platform in 2022, and that they were working on new features not yet announced.

In February 2021, Chromebooks started to launch with Stadia pre-installed.

==== Discontinuation of Stadia ====
On September 29, 2022, Google announced that it would shut down Stadia, citing its lack of traction with users. The service was shut down on January 18, 2023, and Google refunded all purchases for hardware and games made through the Google and Stadia stores leaving its own controller being Bluetooth compatible. All storefront features were disabled with the announcement. The technology behind Stadia was to be utilized in other parts of Google, including with its partners, however, in March 2023, Axios's Stephen Totilo stated that Google has also terminated this white-label service. According to Google's Jack Buser, "We are not offering that streaming option, because it was tied to Stadia itself. So, unfortunately, when we decided to not move forward with Stadia, that sort of [business-to-business] offering could no longer be offered as well."

Shortly after announcing the end of Stadia in October 2022, Google unveiled new Chromebooks designed around cloud gaming, with GeForce Now preinstalled and direct support for Xbox Cloud Gaming, Amazon Luna, and Google Play.

Neither Stadia employees nor game developers were made aware of these plans before the announcement, which caused concern for developers who had planned to release new games on the service. Ubisoft stated that Stadia players would be able to transfer their purchased games to personal computer versions via their Ubisoft Connect platform for free. Other studios said they were evaluating methods to transfer saved game progress from Stadia to other platforms ahead of the shutdown. For example, Bethesda Softworks confirmed that players of Elder Scrolls Online would be able to transfer their Stadia accounts to other platforms. Some games that had been Stadia-exclusive would be released as multiplatform titles, such as Tequila Works' Gylt. Not all Stadia-exclusive games are available elsewhere after its closure. For example, Outcasters from Splash Damage was reliant on Stadia technology, so the developers have no plans to port the game to other systems.

Google officially shut down Stadia on January 18, 2023 at 11:59 PM PST (07:59 UTC).

== Availability and promotions ==
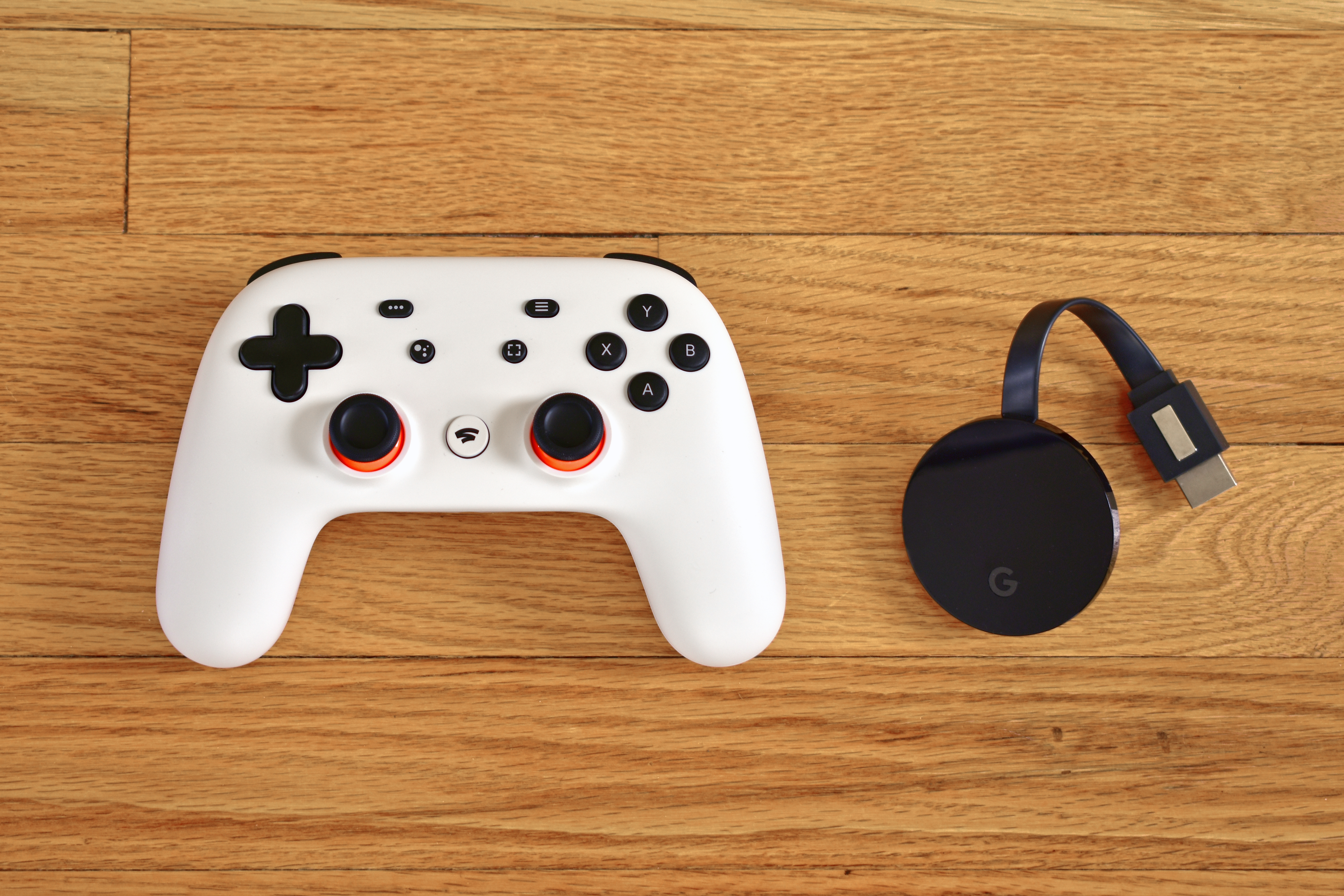
The "Founder's Edition" and "Premiere Edition" bundles for Stadia both included a controller and a Chromecast Ultra, although the controller colors differed.

Stadia initially launched on November 19, 2019, in 14 countries: Belgium, Canada, Denmark, Finland, France, Germany, Ireland, Italy, Netherlands, Norway, Spain, Sweden, the United Kingdom, and the United States. The "Founder's Edition" bundle, which was available for pre-order for US$129 prior to the service's launch, included: a Chromecast Ultra; a limited-edition "Midnight Blue" Stadia controller; three months of Pro service; an additional three months of Pro service to gift to a friend; a Founder's badge next to their user name; and first access to register a user name. After "Founder's Edition" pre-orders sold out, Google announced a "Premiere Edition" bundle for US$129, with a Chromecast Ultra, a "Clearly White" Stadia controller, and a three-month subscription to the Pro tier included. At launch, Stadia was limited to the subscription-only Pro tier.

The service was expanded to several Samsung Galaxy, Razer Phone, and ASUS ROG Phone devices in February 2020, after being only available on Google Pixel devices for months since its launch.

In March 2020, Google sent promotional emails to owners of Chromecast Ultra devices offering three months of Stadia Pro at no cost for redemption. The following month, while many people were quarantining at home during the COVID-19 pandemic, Google launched a free version of Stadia, making it available to anyone in eligible countries with a valid Google account. Two-month Pro subscriptions were given at no cost to all new and existing platform users.

Starting in June 2020, Stadia became accessible on OnePlus's 5, 6, and 7 series phones, and access can be enabled on other Android phones and tablets with Android 6 and above as an "experimental" feature. At the same time, touch controls were made available as an alternative to using a supported controller for touchscreen Android devices. That same month, the "Premiere Edition" bundle received a price reduction to US$99.

In November 2020, Google ran two promotions through which they gave away complimentary "Premiere Edition" bundles. The first, which began on November 10, offered bundles at no cost to YouTube Premium subscribers in the US and the UK who had subscribed before November 6. The promotion ended two days later in the US after Google exhausted all available supply. The second promotion coincided with Stadia's first anniversary on November 19, and offered complimentary bundles to users who purchased a copy of Cyberpunk 2077 on Stadia. Google ended the promotion early on December 10 in Canada and on December 13 in all other regions after exhausting their supply. In March 2021, Google announced a Stadia promotion in anticipation for the release of Resident Evil Village. The promotion offered a free Stadia Premiere kit after the purchase of either the Standard or Deluxe Editions of the game. All Stadia Pro members were given access to a free edition of Resident Evil 7 Gold Edition.

In December 2020, Stadia expanded to eight new European markets: Austria, Czechia, Hungary, Poland, Portugal, Romania, Slovakia and Switzerland. In June 2021, Stadia launched on most Android TV devices including the Chromecast with Google TV, the Nvidia Shield TV and other smart TVs with Android TV support.

== Reception ==
=== Pre-release ===
During its beta, the service received generally positive initial impressions from reviewers, who felt that it met, and in some instances exceeded, expectations, and made for a potentially viable alternative to PC gaming. Ars Technica remarked that Project Stream's login sequence was far simpler than that of other services. Some minor discrepancies and technical issues were nonetheless noted.

Reviewers reported that the streaming service had low latency and felt as if the games were being played locally. Despite this, depending on Wi-Fi speeds, the games sometimes reduced their screen resolution or lagged. A test by The Verge found no lag issues over a wired Ethernet connection, and occasional stuttering on a shared Wi-Fi connection. However, even on a wired connection, the stream did not output at 4K resolution and occasionally went fuzzy with compression artifacting. The reviewer reported the best experience on Google's Pixelbook. Polygon found the service's audio compression noticeable. Digital Foundry performed a hands-on with Assassin's Creed Odyssey on a Pixelbook on the service in Beta, and found that in the testing environment, latency seemed acceptable, but there was a noticeable visual hit. They also remarked that Assassin's Creed Odyssey was not the best example for testing, as it did not operate at 60 frames per second.

=== Post-release ===
Stadia received mixed reviews upon its release according to review aggregator Metacritic. Wired Magazine described the image quality as "drab", but admitted to preferring to play Destiny 2 on a Chromebook instead of a larger gaming laptop. VentureBeat criticized the service's pricing model, comparing it unfavorably to subscription services such as Xbox Game Pass, and claiming that Stadia "doesn't matter". Digital Foundry found that the service was not playing all games at 4K resolutions: Red Dead Redemption 2 was found to only run at 1440p, and Destiny 2 ran at only 1080p (albeit at a frame rate higher than that of the console versions). Digital Foundry also said that games like Red Dead Redemption 2 struggled to maintain a consistent 60 frames per second, claiming that their test of the game on Chromecast only managed a solid 30 FPS, while a test on the Chrome browser showed an unstable 60 FPS that dropped frequently. The Guardian gave Stadia three stars out of five, praising the service's technical performance, while criticising its game selection for being too old and only featuring one exclusive. Ars Technica concluded: "Early adopters feel like they're getting a beta product here. Wait until next year to see if Google can work out the kinks and prove the service's longevity." S&P Global Market Intelligence reported that: "Stadia met with tepid enthusiasm from analysts and early adopters who criticized the service's slate of launch titles and lack of promoted features". Dieter Bohn from The Verge said that "I have put in enough hours in enough conditions to say that this is a beta product, and Google should have labeled it as such and launched it differently. Because even in the best conditions, this ain't the best."

Toward the end of January 2020, Stadia users expressed concern about Google's lack of communication about Stadia, outside of announcing monthly free game additions. These users were concerned about planned features that were only months away on Google's initial timeline, but had yet to be discussed further, such as 4K streaming resolution support. A Google community manager had been following these discussions and expressed sympathy for users who were waiting for information, saying that there was news coming soon. Google's official response was to direct users to its Stadia community site, where it was providing weekly updates on the progress of Stadia's features, and said that it left it to publishers to announce when new games would be available on Stadia.

Cyberpunk 2077 experienced a tumultuous launch on eighth-generation consoles such as the PlayStation 4 and Xbox One as they struggled to run the game without major performance issues and bugs, and in some cases, saw a delayed ability to download the game. Players who ran the game through Stadia saw fewer instances of crashes and an overall smoother experience.

== Cancelled games ==
The following games were announced for the Stadia service but never received a Stadia release due to the discontinuation of the service in 2023. All were released on other platforms.

Title	Developer	Publisher	Ref.
Avatar: Frontiers of Pandora	Massive Entertainment	Ubisoft	
Baldur's Gate 3	Larian Studios	Larian Studios	
Cyberpunk 2077: Phantom Liberty (Expansion pack)	CD Projekt RED	CD Projekt	
Skull and Bones	Ubisoft Singapore	Ubisoft	
XDefiant (Note: Discontinued and servers shuttered entirely in 2025.)	Ubisoft San Francisco	Ubisoft	

== See also ==
- Google Play Games
