= Secret Lab =

Australian video game developer

- Industry: Video game development
- Founded: 8 July 2008; 18 years ago in Hobart, Tasmania
- Founder: Paris Buttfield-Addison; Jon Manning
- Headquarters: Hobart, Australia
- Products: Video games
- Website: http://www.secretlab.com.au

Secret Lab is an independent computer game developer based in Hobart, Australia. They are best known for their work on Night in the Woods, the Qantas Joey Playbox games, the Australian Broadcasting Corporation Play School Play Time and Art Maker games.

== History ==
Secret Lab was slated to develop the Tiki Bar TV video game, Day of the Tiki. Secret Lab also developed the tie-in video games for Canadian superhero web series, Heroes of the North. Secret Lab also works on the critically acclaimed adventure game, Night in the Woods, building dialogue engine tools, and creating the mobile version of the game.

In December 2010, Secret Lab's founders were jointly awarded one of Australia's most prestigious awards for technology, the Pearcey Award by then Premier of Tasmania David Bartlett. Secret Lab was also awarded three Tas ICT Awards in 2010: "Success in Exporting ICT Solutions", "Excellence in Digital Media or E-Marketing" and the "Tas ICT President's Award for Excellence". In 2013, Secret Lab received the Tas ICT Award for "Best Software Product" for their work on the Australian Broadcasting Corporation Play School Play Time app for iPad.

Secret Lab was responsible for the development of a number of popular iPad Applications, including the Australian Broadcasting Corporation Foodi app for iPad, as well as the Play School Art Maker and Play Time apps for iPad. Both Foodi and the Play School Art Maker app were finalists for the 2011 Australian Interactive Media Industry Association (AIMIA) Awards in the "Best Cultural and Lifestyle" and "Best Application on a Tablet or Mobile" categories, respectively.

In 2013, Secret Lab's Play School Play Time app was a finalist for the AIMIA "Best of Tablet - Entertainment" and "Best of Tablet - Learning and Education" awards, and went on to win "Best of Tablet - Entertainment" and the overall "Best of Tablet" AIMIA awards. Secret Lab's work for Qantas also yielded a 2016 iAward for "Mobility Innovation of the Year". Co-founder Paris Buttfield-Addison received a 2016 "Gold Disruptor" award at the Australian Computer Society Reimagination Thought Leaders' Summit in Sydney.

Secret Lab's founders, Dr Paris Buttfield-Addison and Dr Jon Manning, are co-authors of more than 20 books for O'Reilly Media and For Dummies.
