= Tequila Works =

Spanish video game developer

Tequila Works S.L.
- Type: Private
- Industry: Video games
- Founded: 2009; 17 years ago
- Founders: Raúl Rubio; Lauren Manuel Garcia Carro; German Martinez
- Defunct: 12 November 2024; 2 years ago
- Headquarters: Madrid, Spain
- Key people: Raúl Rubio; (CEO and creative director); Lauren Manuel Garcia Carro; (Co-Founder & CTO); German Martinez; (Co-Founder & Head of TV Division); Cesar Sampedro; (Art Director); Luz Sancho; (chairwoman)
- Number of employees: 70 (2019)
- Website: tequilaworks.com

Tequila Works S.L. was a Spanish video game developer based in Madrid. Founded in 2009 by Raúl Rubio and Lauren Manuel Garcia Carro and German Martinez, the company is best known for developing Deadlight and Rime.

== History ==
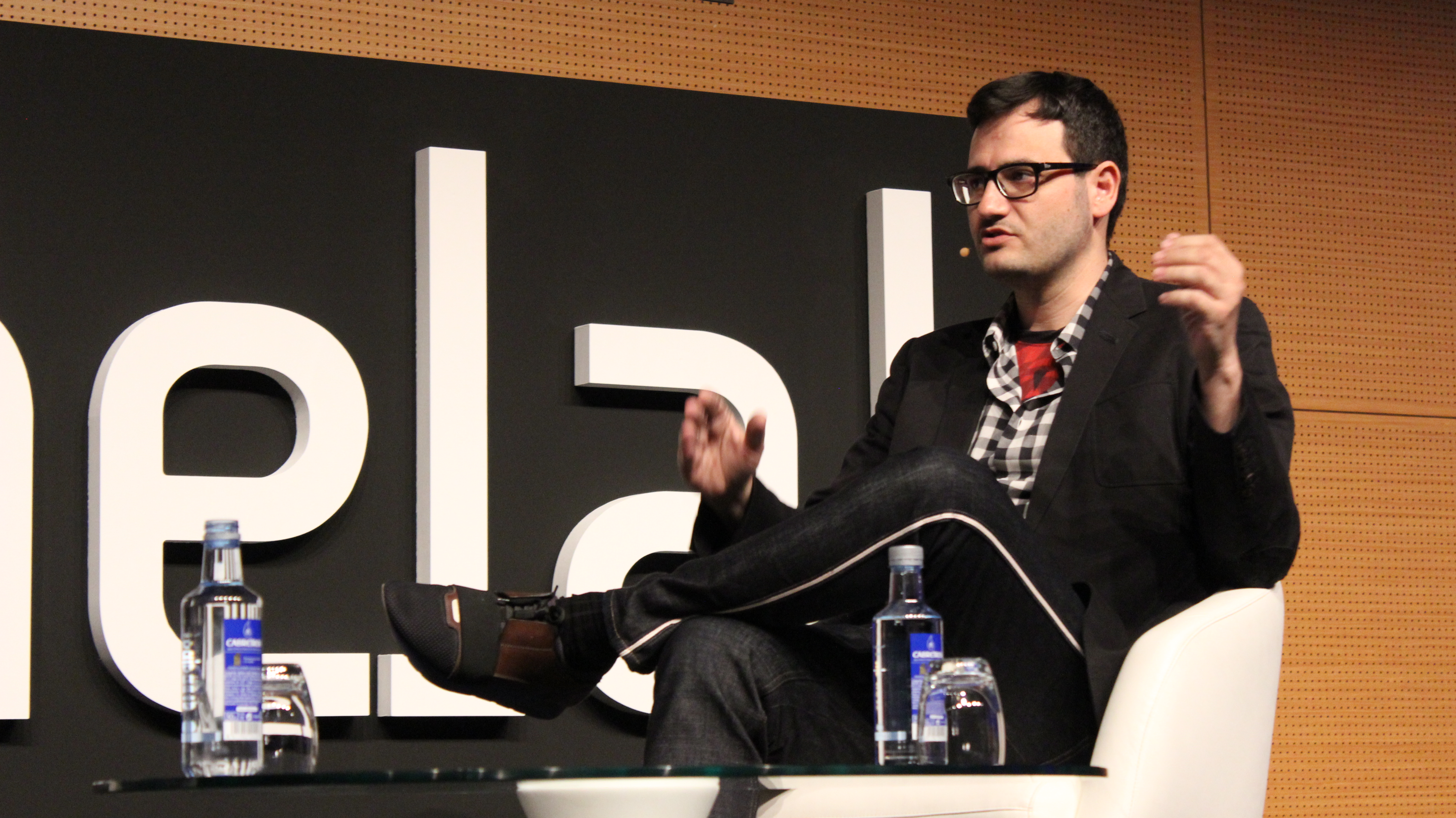
Co-founder and CEO Raúl Rubio in 2017

Tequila Works was founded in Madrid in 2009 by Raúl Rubio Munárriz, Lauren Manuel Garcia Carro and German Martinez. On 18 January 2012, Tequila Works announced their first project, Deadlight. Tequila Works' next project was Rime, a puzzle video game originally intended to be a PlayStation 4-exclusive game. However, the team decided to acquire the intellectual property from Sony in the middle of the game's development and bring the game to other platforms. Rime was released in May 2017. The company also collaborated with GameTrust Games on a virtual reality project named The Invisible Hours, in which players will solve a murder mystery.

In 2017, the company partnered with British developer Cavalier Game Studios to publish Cavalier's first game, The Sexy Brutale, while providing additional development. The company also published WonderWorlds by Guildford-based start-up studio Glowmade.

In February 2019, Sony Pictures Virtual Reality announced a VR game by Tequila Works titled Groundhog Day: Like Father Like Son, which is set 26 years after Groundhog Day starring Bill Murray, planned to release later in 2019 for PSVR, Oculus Rift and HTC Vive. In May 2019, Tequila Works revealed that they have two projects in production and one in pre-production.

In March 2022, Tequila Works announced that it had received an investment from Tencent which will be used to grow the studio and develop more original IP. The investment was undisclosed and is only known to make the Chinese conglomerate a major investor into the company.

In November 2024, it was announced that Tequila Works had filed for insolvency due to "prolonged market conditions".

== Games ==
Overview of Tequila Works video games
Year	Title	Genre(s)	Platform(s)	Developer(s)	Publisher(s)
2012	Deadlight	Action-adventure, puzzle	Microsoft Windows, PlayStation 4, Xbox 360, Xbox One	Tequila Works	Microsoft Studios, Deep Silver
2017	The Sexy Brutale	Adventure, puzzle	Microsoft Windows, Nintendo Switch, PlayStation 4, Xbox One	Cavalier Game Studios, Tequila Works	Tequila Works
2017	Rime	Adventure, platform	Microsoft Windows, Nintendo Switch, PlayStation 4, Xbox One	Tequila Works	Grey Box, Six Foot
2017	The Invisible Hours	Adventure	Microsoft Windows, PlayStation 4, Xbox One	Tequila Works	GameTrust Games
2017	WonderWorlds	Action-adventure	iOS	Glowmade	Tequila Works
2019	Groundhog Day: Like Father Like Son	Adventure, puzzle	PlayStation VR, Oculus Rift, HTC Vive	Tequila Works	Sony Pictures VR
2019	Gylt	Action-adventure, puzzle	Stadia, Microsoft Windows, PlayStation 4, Xbox One, PlayStation 5, Xbox Series X and Series S	Tequila Works	Tequila Works
2023	Song of Nunu: A League of Legends Story	Action-adventure, puzzle	Microsoft Windows, Nintendo Switch, PlayStation 4, Xbox One, PlayStation 5, Xbox Series X and Series S	Tequila Works	Riot Forge
