= Haunt the House: Terrortown =

2013 action puzzle video game

- Developer: SFB Games
- Publisher: SFB Games
- Designer: Adam Vian
- Programmer: Tom Vian
- Artist: Adam Vian
- Writers: Adam Vian; Tom Vian
- Composer: Raphael Benjamin Meyer
- Engine: Adobe Flash
- Platforms: PlayStation Vita, Microsoft Windows, OS X, Android, iOS
- Release: PlayStation Vita: WW: 9 January 2013; Microsoft Windows, OS X: WW: 6 June 2014; Android, iOS: WW: 30 October 2014
- Genres: Action, puzzle
- Mode: Single-player

Haunt the House: Terrortown is a side-scrolling action puzzle video game developed by SFB Games. The game was released for PlayStation Vita on 9 January 2013, for Microsoft Windows and OS X on 6 June 2014, and for Android and iOS on 30 October 2014.

== Gameplay ==
The game starts in an abandoned town where a ghost lives until people start to move into the town, disturbing its sleep. It attempts to scare everyone out of the town to rest in peace once again. The player can move the ghost around a building and possess objects to scare people. The more people it scares, the more paranormal powers it will gain. The goal of the game is to scare everyone out of a building; however, if a person is scared too much, they may commit suicide by throwing themselves out of a window. Once a building is empty, the player moves on to the next building. After everyone is scared out of town, the ghost is shown to be in a painting of what appears to be its family.

By scaring people, the player can raise the room's "atmosphere" which unlocks new actions for possessed objects. Some actions can be used to kill certain characters that can't be scared, and they will become a ghost that travels back to the clock tower. They will also appear in the painting at the tower.

== Reception ==
Reception

Aggregate score
Aggregator	Score
Metacritic	VITA/iOS: 73/100

Haunt the House: Terrortown received "mixed or average" reviews, according to review aggregator website Metacritic, on which the PlayStation Vita and iOS versions both hold an aggregated review score of 73/100, based on four reviews each. Representatively for Eurogamer, Christian Donlan gave the game a score of 8/10, saying "Emotional cruelty, suicide, haunted euphoniums—there's a surprisingly dark heart beating away inside this cheery little Halloween special. There's a genuine sense of mischief, too, conveyed by the bug-eyed howls of your prey and the looping, lilting tones of the jazz-club soundtrack."
