= Deadlight (video game) =

2012 video game

- Xbox Live Arcade cover art
- Developer: Tequila Works
- Publishers: Microsoft Studios; Deep Silver (Director's Cut)
- Director: Raúl Rubio Munárriz
- Producers: Amaia Markuleta Arrula; Isaac Barrón Herman
- Designer: Raúl Rubio Munárriz
- Artist: César Sampedro Guerra
- Writer: Antonio Rojano
- Composer: David García Díaz
- Engine: Unreal Engine 3
- Platforms: Xbox 360, Microsoft Windows, PlayStation 4, Xbox One
- Release: Xbox 360: WW: August 1, 2012; Windows: WW: October 25, 2012; Director's Cut: WW: June 21, 2016
- Genres: Side-scroller, cinematic platformer, survival horror
- Mode: Single-player

Deadlight is a side-scrolling cinematic platforming survival horror video game developed by Tequila Works and published by Microsoft Studios for Xbox 360 and Microsoft Windows. It was released for Xbox 360 in August 2012 via Xbox Live Arcade, and for Windows in October via Steam. In 2016, a Director's Cut version was released for Windows, PlayStation 4 and Xbox One, published by Deep Silver.

The game is intended as a throwback and homage to classic side-scrolling cinematic platformers of the 1980s and early 1990s, such as Prince of Persia, Another World and Flashback. Set in Seattle in 1986, the game tells the story of Randall Wayne, a former park ranger who embarks to find his family in the aftermath of a zombie apocalypse. Separated from the group with whom he has joined, Wayne must attempt to traverse Seattle to get to the "safe zone", where he believes his family will be waiting. On the way however, he must avoid both zombie hordes, and a group of vigilantes known as the "New Law", who have established themselves as the de facto authority in Seattle. As he travels across the city, he begins to question his memory of the events during the early stages of the outbreak.

Deadlight received mixed reviews, with critics praising the graphics and atmosphere, but condemning the game's brevity and linearity. The PC version was generally viewed as superior to the Xbox 360 version. The game was nominated for "Best Debut Game" at the 9th British Academy Games Awards, losing to The Unfinished Swan.

== Gameplay ==
Deadlight is a 2.5D side-scrolling cinematic platformer/survival horror in which the player character, Randall Wayne, can move from left-to-right and right-to-left, but is unable to enter any environments off the aligned path. The character can walk, sprint, crouch, roll, jump, long jump, wall jump in narrow areas, climb fences and ladders, hang from wires, push and pull certain objects, and perform contextual actions such as using switches and examining bodies.

Gameplay primarily consists of platforming and solving puzzles so that Wayne can avoid the many "Shadows" (zombies) populating the streets of Seattle. The levels are designed in such a way that the player is encouraged to avoid Shadows as much as possible, rather than engaging them in combat. When combat is unavoidable, the player can use a fire axe to execute short-range melee attacks, which consumes stamina, or later, a revolver, and subsequently a shotgun, although ammunition for both weapons is extremely limited. The player also gains access to a slingshot. However, this cannot be used in combat, and is instead used for solving puzzles. There are only a few occasions when combat is unavoidable, and generally, the emphasis remains on avoiding and outwitting Shadows. One method of doing so is the "taunt" feature, which allows Wayne to lure Shadows to their death by calling to them, leading them into environmental hazards such as chasms or exposed electricity. Even if the player is armed, being attacked by multiple Shadows at any time means almost certain death.

Wayne begins with three health points which can be replenished using first aid kits. The number of health points will increase by a single point if the player discovers health power-ups. Sprinting, melee combat, and hanging from objects deplete the player's stamina meter, which causes the screen to blur, and Wayne to pause in order to get his breath back. As with the health meter, the amount of available stamina can be increased by power-ups. Unlike health, however, the stamina meter refills over time.

The game contains hidden collectable items. Some are entries from the player's diary, revealing more about his backstory. Others are personal memorabilia lost by people during the outbreak. The player can also find three playable 80s-style handheld video games. A recurring collectible comes in the form of identification cards, all of which feature the name of serial killers (like John Wayne Gacy, Aileen Wuornos and Jeffrey Dahmer), although the photo ID on the cards depict members of Tequila Works' staff.

== Plot ==
The game takes place in Seattle, beginning on July 4, 1986, one-hundred-and-forty-five days since "Patient Zero". Society has been nearly decimated by the outbreak of a virus that reanimates the dead, turning them into what the survivors refer to as "Shadows". Randall Wayne, a park ranger from Hope, British Columbia in Canada, has been separated from his wife Shannon and daughter Lydia for some time, and traveled to Seattle because of reports of the last remaining "Safe Point" in the Pacific Northwest. Convinced that his family is at the Safe Point, he is accompanied by fellow park ranger, Ben Parker. After arriving in the city, they joined with a group of four other people; a police officer named Sam Powell, and twin sisters, Stella and Karla Patterson, and an unnamed university professor who is killed by the shadows prior to the game's events.

As the game begins, Wayne has just shot Karla in the head, since she had been bitten and was about to turn into a Shadow. As Ben, Sam and Stella return to the warehouse in which they are sheltering, the building is attacked by Shadows, drawn by the gunfire. The trio flee through a skylight, but the ladder breaks before Wayne can follow, and he tells them to head to the Safe Point, where he will meet them.

Wayne leaves the warehouse and sets out across the city. He soon learns of a violent militia group known as the "New Law", that kills anyone unwilling to join them. After finding Sam's van crashed, Wayne locates him in a nearby shop, seriously wounded, and bleeding to death. The van was ambushed by the New Law, who took Ben and Stella with them, leaving Sam for dead. He tells Wayne the Safe Point is actually a trap set up by the New Law, hoping to lure in survivors, so they can kill them and take any supplies they may have. After Sam dies, Wayne sets out, determined to rescue his family and friends from the New Law.

As he heads towards the Safe Point, he is cornered by a herd of Shadows. However, before they can attack him, a hand reaches up from a manhole and drags him down into the sewers. Wayne is knocked unconscious, and experiences flashbacks of his life before the outbreak, mingled with vague memories of returning to his home upon the onset of the Shadows. Waking up in the sewers, he meets the "Rat", a Vietnam veteran who has turned the sewer system into an elaborate series of booby traps to protect himself from both Shadows and the New Law. The Rat tells Wayne if he can make it through the traps, he will help him find his friends. When Wayne does so, the Rat tells him that his teenage son is missing, and asks Wayne to find him. The Rat promises to search for information on Wayne's family and friends if his teenage son is brought back.

Wayne agrees and sets out to search for the boy, although he continues to have distracting visions of his daughter. After crashing a van, Wayne is contacted via radio by an unknown person, who guides him to safety on the rooftop of a nearby building. The person is the Rat's son, who was looking for food when he was attacked by the New Law. As Wayne and the boy talk, a New Law helicopter appears, opening fire on them. They flee, eventually returning to the sewers, whereupon the Rat tells Wayne that Ben and Stella are at the Seattle Center Coliseum, which is held by the New Law. However, he was unable to find any information on Wayne's family.

Wayne heads to the stadium, where he finds Ben being tortured by the New Law, who leave a Shadow to kill him. He rescues Ben, who tells him the New Law have taken Stella to the Safe Point. After acquiring medical supplies for Ben, they head to the Safe Point via a stolen New Law helicopter. However, en route, Ben loses consciousness and the helicopter crashes. Ben is killed, but Wayne survives, and, after another confusing memory of the last day he saw his family, makes it to the Safe Point. After rescuing Stella, in order to cover their escape, Wayne turns off the power generator, allowing the Shadows to penetrate the facility.

Amidst the chaos, Wayne and Stella escape to a dock, but are cornered by a group of Shadows. Stella pleads with Wayne to kill her, causing him to recall a repressed memory. Upon returning to his home after the outbreak, he found he had only two bullets in his gun. With the house under siege from Shadows, Shannon pleaded with him to kill her and Lydia. With great reluctance, Wayne obliges. Having remembered the incident, he refuses to repeat it by killing Stella, instead telling her she must survive and never give up hope. He breaks the wood of the dock, allowing Stella to make it to a nearby sailboat and drift away. Wayne apologizes to his deceased daughter, who appears in front of him, as he laments he should have died with her. However, he is happy they will be together again soon. As the Shadows race towards him, Wayne accepts his fate.

In an alternate ending, unlockable by completing "Nightmare" mode, it is revealed Wayne is a deranged murderer. As he and Stella attempt to board the boat, Stella recognizes Wayne is wearing Karla's necklace. She pushes him away, and he falls, smashing his head against a post. He remembers he killed Karla even though she was not bitten, he smothered Sam upon finding him uninjured in the shop, and he choked Ben in the helicopter, causing it to crash. As he lies bleeding to death, he has a vision of Lydia before blacking out.

== Development and release ==
Deadlight was announced on January 18, 2012 as an Xbox Live Arcade exclusive, set for release during the annual Summer of Arcade. Microsoft Studios revealed they would publish the game, which was being developed by Tequila Works. Although Deadlight was Tequila Works' debut, the development team included people who had worked on the Commandos and MotorStorm series, as well as games such as Overlord II, Heavy Rain, Castlevania: Lords of Shadow and Diablo III. The following day, a teaser trailer was released, with a demo made available on March 5. Speaking of the demo, Eurogamer's Martin Robinson noted the similarity between the movement and animations of Randall Wayne and the protagonists of classic cinematic platformers such as Another World and Flashback.

This similarity was very much by design, as director, co-writer and designer Raúl Rubio Munárriz explains,

Deadlight is like a game from the 80s in many ways, not only in the way it's played, but in its story, its look. This type of dystopian tale of doom and gloom is typical of the period at the end of the 70s and early 80s, typified by the work of comic book artists such as Richard Corben; the solitary figure that wanders the road living his own personal drama. If you combine that with the typical 80s backdrop, the storyline, the analogical aspects, the gray weather, the feeling of loneliness, with this genre, often seen in the 80s and 90s, like Prince of Persia, Another World, Flashback, cinematic platformers in which the world is a character itself, you achieve something original, a return to the 80s, not just at a narrative or aesthetic level, but at the level of the gameplay itself.

Munárriz further explains, "If you remember Prince of Persia or Another World, the animation technique used was rotoscoping; people are filmed first and then their movements are copied. Initially we did the same, recording ourselves on video. For this type of retro game, it was important that the animation was smooth. Characters needed to be dynamic, so we used key frame. If we had used motion capture, the game would have lost that 80s feel."

Gameplay in Deadlight. The player is climbing a ladder on the right of the screen. The image shows both the 2.5D graphics, with Wayne presented as a silhouette against detailed backgrounds, and the dystopian atmosphere of the game.

Of the game's graphical style in general, the developers state:

the game itself is told through silhouettes, which helps us to define the gameplay area. All the main game area is harsh-shadow 2D, but the landscape and the background is very detailed, because that's how Randall sees his world; all the characters are shadows of their former selves. Randall himself is living in a dying world, but this world will keep going without him, so the graphics represent how Randall sees what's happening to him.

In relation to the artistic style, video game artist Abel Oroz Vincente states "The artistic aspect of Deadlight is the foundation upon which the game is largely built. The game is its atmosphere, and the atmosphere is achieved largely thanks to the visuals. The key is in the hyperrealism and the overexposed lighting, which is not hyperrealistic, but we use it as a stylizing tool." 3D artist Pablo Fernández Gómez further explains "It's a pictorial approach to the reality that awakens a certain sensation, and helps the player understand and play the game."

When the game was shown at the 2012 E3 event in June, Munárriz stated "the idea was recreating the old gameplay with striking visuals. So the visual style was inspired by movies from the 80s such as First Blood." He also cites as influences on the story Richard Matheson's 1954 novel I Am Legend, Stephen King's 2006 novel Cell, Cormac McCarthy's 2006 novel The Road, and Robert Kirkman's comic book series The Walking Dead.

Randall Wayne was named after a character in J. G. Ballard's 1981 novel Hello America, the stowaway Wayne. In terms of Randall's persona, the developers were not interested in creating a typical video game hero, someone who could easily fight off attacking zombies. They instead looked at "what would the average person do if the apocalypse suddenly hit tomorrow?" Co-writer Antonio Rojano Mora explains "We wanted a character that wasn't your typical cop, soldier, murderer or survivor. He's just a normal guy with his own problems, weaknesses and fears." Munárriz similarly states "he is not a soldier, he is not a scientist, he is not a hero."

On October 5, Tequila announced the game was being released for Microsoft Windows via Steam, having sold well on Xbox Live Arcade. The Windows version would feature improved graphics, and a new nightmare difficulty mode, where the player's progress is not saved.

On March 21, 2016, a Director's Cut version was announced for Windows, PlayStation 4 and Xbox One. Published by Deep Silver, the new version features enhanced controls, new animations, and full 1080p resolution. A new gameplay mode, the "Survival Arena", is also included. The Director's Cut was released via Steam, GOG.com, PlayStation Network and Xbox Live on June 21.

== Reception ==
Reception

Aggregate score
Aggregator	Score
Metacritic	X360: 68/100; PC: 78/100; PS4: 70/100; XONE: 69/100

Review scores
Publication	Score
1Up.com	A−
Electronic Gaming Monthly	6.2/10
Eurogamer	7/10
Game Informer	8/10
GameSpot	6.5/10
IGN	8.5/10
Official Xbox Magazine (US)	8.5/10
X-Play	3.5/5

Deadlight received mixed reviews, with the much less widely reviewed PC version generally seen as superior to the Xbox 360 version. On Metacritic, the Xbox version has an aggregate score of 68 out of 100 based on 79 reviews, while the PC version has a score of 78 out of 100 based on 7 reviews.

IGN's Ryan McCaffrey scored it 8.5 out of 10, calling it "one of the finest XBLA titles of the year." He was particularly impressed with the graphics; "its aesthetic is gorgeous [...] Several of Deadlight's set-pieces are so stunning that I had to actually stop to admire them before pressing onward." However, he was critical of the puzzle-based levels in the sewers, the ease with which the player can die, and the final section of the game, writing "These flaws are the difference between Limbo's transcendent excellence and Deadlight's mere greatness."

Official Xbox Magazine's Francesca Reyes also scored it 8.5 out of 10, commending the gameplay, difficulty level, and the pacing; "it makes for a frantic, dizzying, four- to five-hour rush. And that's Deadlight's strongest suit: you feel a constant, adrenaline-fueled urge to just. Keep. Moving."

1Up.com's Marty Sliva graded it an A−, praising the gameplay; "Whether you're barreling through a zombie infested intersection Canabalt-style, slowly deciphering the traps of a sewer-dwelling madman, or methodically picking off a pack of enemies, the game is constantly switching up its own internal play style." He concluded by calling the game "a fantastic title that stands out far more than many big budget, AAA titles."

Game Informer's Tim Turi scored it 8 out of 10, writing "Deadlight mixes Shadow Complex's impressive 2.5D visuals, Limbo's rewarding platforming puzzles, and The Walking Dead's grim atmosphere. The resulting cocktail is potent." He was critical of the plot, calling it the "biggest flaw", but concluded "Creating a compelling zombie game in a generation with too many of them is a hard task. Tequila Works manages to do this while successfully merging it with the unlikely action-platforming genre."

Eurogamer's Martin Robinson scored it 7 out of 10, praising the graphics and atmosphere; "sense of place is what elevates Deadlight, and it's intelligently explored by Tequila Works. Abandoned traffic jams on grey-lit freeways give way to rain-specked neon motel signs and then murky edgelands. In the city, Randall leaps across fire escapes and evades chasing helicopters in Canabalt-esque rooftop chases, and in the suburbs he bounds from house to house while racing past destroyed domestic scenes. Never has a 2D world felt so believable." However, he was critical of the game's brevity, calling it "an incredibly slight experience", and arguing "there's not enough meat to come back to, making this a one-shot affair with a bloated price tag that doesn't quite fit."

GameSpot's Chris Watters scored it 6.5 out of 10, writing "Deadlight draws you in with its rich, pervasive atmosphere, but doesn't give you much to do once you're there", calling the game "an alluringly dark, but disappointingly shallow experience." He praised the graphics, arguing "the artistic elements work in harmony to make Deadlight a visually compelling game." However, he was critical of the gameplay, writing "linearity isn't inherently negative, but performing the same few moves to progress down a clearly marked path doesn't hold its appeal for long." He concluded "In the three or so hours that it takes to complete the game, you feel less like you are trekking through a dangerous world, and more like you are acting out a script. Deadlight's engrossing visuals make it fun to play the part, but you'll wish you had more lines."

Electronic Gaming Monthly's Evan Bourgault scored it 6.2 out of 10, and was especially critical of the controls and the game's brevity. He concluded "Deadlight could've been a much better game if it had a more fleshed-out story, a control scheme that wasn't frustrating, and a longer play time. It starts off promising enough, but the wonder of it all screeches to a halt during its second half."

X-Play's Miguel Concepcion scored it 3.5 out of 5, writing "The studio (Tequila Works) has crafted a detailed mid-1980's Seattle, delivering a side-scrolling trek that is a bit on the easy side and would have benefitted with more challenging puzzles." He concluded that the series was in perfect position to continue, stating "Tequila Works has adequately positioned itself for Deadlight sequels that can go well beyond the tale of its initial protagonist."

=== Sales ===
The game has sold over 53,000 copies.
