= SFB Games =

British video game developer

SFB Games Limited
- Formerly: The Super Flash Bros. (2002–2012)
- Type: Private
- Industry: Video games
- Founded: 2 September 2002; 24 years ago
- Founders: Tom Vian; Adam Vian
- Headquarters: London, England
- Key people: Tom Vian (technical director); Adam Vian (creative director)
- Website: sfbgames.com

SFB Games Limited is a British video game developer based in London. The studio was established in 2002 by brothers Tom and Adam Vian, who, as "The Super Flash Bros.", produced browser games and animations in Adobe Flash for websites such as Newgrounds and Armor Games. At SFB Games, Tom acts as technical director, while Adam occupies the role of creative director.

== History ==
On 2 September 2002, brothers Tom and Adam Vian, at the time aged 17 and 14, respectively, established a Newgrounds account under the name The Super Flash Bros., and uploaded their first Adobe Flash movie, Metal Gear Mayhem, the same day. The duo went on hiatus when Tom started attending university. After reforming, they entered into a partnership with Armor Games, whereby Armor Games would fund all future Flash games created by the two brothers. In total, they developed 34 games for Armor Games. On 16 May 2012, the studio incorporated as SFB Games Limited under the United Kingdom company law, the "SFB" being an abbreviation of the former name.

== Games developed ==
Year	Title	Platform(s)	Publisher(s)	Ref(s)
2013	Phantom Pharaoh's Treasure Trap	Browser	Adult Swim Games	
2013	Haunt the House: Terrortown	Android, iOS, macOS, Microsoft Windows, PlayStation Vita	SFB Games	
2014	Detective Grimoire: Secret of the Swamp	Android, iOS, Linux, macOS, Microsoft Windows	Armor Games	
2015	Rugby Golf	Android, iOS	SFB Games	
2016	Launchasaurus	Android, iOS	SFB Games	
2017	Snipperclips	Nintendo Switch	Nintendo	
2017	Snipperclips Plus	Nintendo Switch	Nintendo	
2018	Marching Order	Android, iOS	SFB Games	
2019	Tangle Tower	Apple Arcade, PC, Nintendo Switch, Xbox One, PlayStation 4	SFB Games	
2024	Crow Country	PC, Xbox Series X/S, PlayStation 4, PlayStation 5, Nintendo Switch	SFB Games	
2026	The Mermaid Mask	PC, PlayStation 5, Nintendo Switch, Nintendo Switch 2	SFB Games	
