= Snipperclips =

2017 video game

Snipperclips: Cut It Out, Together!
- Promotional image showing the main characters, Snip (magenta) and Clip (yellow)
- Developer: SFB Games (Note: Additional work by Nintendo Software Technology)
- Publisher: Nintendo
- Director: Adam Vian
- Producers: Takao Nakano; Toyokazu Nonaka
- Designer: Adam Vian
- Programmers: Tom Vian; Daniel Gallagher
- Artists: Catherine Unger; Kitt Byrne
- Composer: Calum Bowen
- Engine: Unity
- Platform: Nintendo Switch
- Release: March 3, 2017; Snipperclips Plus; November 10, 2017
- Genre: Puzzle
- Modes: Single-player, multiplayer

Snipperclips: Cut It Out, Together! (Note: Known in Japan as Issho ni Chokitto Snippers (いっしょにチョキッと スニッパーズ, Issho ni Chokitto Sunippāzu)) is a puzzle video game developed by SFB Games and published by Nintendo for the Nintendo Switch. The game was released worldwide as a launch title for the Nintendo Switch on March 3, 2017. An expanded version, titled Snipperclips Plus, was released on November 10, 2017. In the game, the players have a "snipping" mechanic where they can cut the other player into a different shape, which is used to solve the various puzzles.

The game was originally a prototype on Adobe Flash. The developers knew it could be successful, so they reached out to Nintendo and began developing a final product. They decided on releasing the game for the Nintendo Switch, and the game was released alongside the console as a launch title. Snipperclips Plus was created to expand upon the previous game after it became successful. The game received generally positive reviews and was nominated for multiple awards for its gameplay.

== Gameplay ==
The four players cut into various shapes, attempting to get a basketball into a hoop.

Snipperclips is a co-operative puzzle game for up to four players. In the main World mode for one or two players, players control two characters named Snip and Clip, who each possess shaped bodies that can be rotated in place. When the two characters overlap each other, one player can snip the overlapped portion out of the other player, altering the shape of their body. Using this mechanic, players must come up with creative ways to solve various puzzles, each with unique objectives, such as fitting inside a shape template, carrying objects, or cutting out a pointed end in order to pop balloons. Additionally, up to four players can play the game's Party and Blitz modes. Party mode features unique puzzles designed for extra players, while Blitz mode features various competitive games, such as basketball, hockey, and snipping deathmatches.

== Development ==
Snipperclips was originally made as a prototype on Adobe Flash in 2015 by SFB Games, namely brothers Adam and Tom Vian, and was originally titled Friendshapes; it was created for a game jam, a video game development competition where they needed to create a game in eight hours. Much like the final version, it had a school art supply theme. When the game was released, the creators believed the game could be much bigger and reached out to Nintendo for funding. They agreed Nintendo would be the best choice for publishing as they knew Nintendo was known for family content and multiplayer.

SFB Games describe the development process as cooperative, with both SFB Games and Nintendo working together to conceptualize game design, levels, and art. Although the game was planned to be released for the Wii U, the Nintendo Switch was starting to be rumored and nearing announcement. While they decided what console to release the game on, SFB Games created a version of the game on PC. The team was invited by Nintendo to a conference in 2016 where they revealed the Switch to the developers, showing off info about its features and the Joy-Con controllers. They decided to release the game on the Nintendo Switch due to the Joy-Con controllers and possible abilities for multiplayer. Snipperclips was announced alongside the reveal of the Nintendo Switch, and released as a launch title for the console alongside games such as The Legend of Zelda: Breath of the Wild.

The game's protagonists, Snip and Clip, appear together as a Spirit in Super Smash Bros. Ultimate—a form of collectible that appear as various characters from video game series. An arrangement of various music tracks from the game's first world, titled "Noisy Notebook", also appears as one of the many selectable music tracks for various stages.

=== Snipperclips Plus ===
An updated version of Snipperclips, titled Snipperclips Plus, was released on November 10, 2017. The updated version adds thirty new levels across two new worlds, a new multiplayer mode, and a new mode allowing players to attempt completed puzzles using randomly shaped bodies. The game was released as a standalone retail product and was also made available as a downloadable content add-on for the original game.

When Snipperclips released in March 2017, SFB Games started planning how they could expand upon the base game. They came up with new ideas after watching people play the game on social media platforms such as YouTube. For example, they often saw people use the same shapes to complete puzzles, such as making a scoop to hold objects, so design was focused on using different shapes to solve puzzles. The add-on was designed to be more complex and difficult, and their development philosophy was to expand on the "core" concept of simple multiplayer levels. They also added a new feature, called "Random Shape", where the player would start off the level in a different body shape that changed after each level; the concept was added to help add replay value.

== Reception ==
Reception

Aggregate scores
Aggregator	Score
Metacritic	80/100 (Plus) 84/100
OpenCritic	91% recommend(Plus) (Note: Based on 11 reviews.)

Review scores
Publication	Score
Computer Games Magazine	9.5/10
Destructoid	(DLC) 8.5/10
Electronic Gaming Monthly	3/5
Game Informer	8.25/10
GameRevolution	8/10
GameSpot	7/10
Hardcore Gamer	4/5
IGN	8/10
Nintendo Life	(Plus) 8/10
Nintendo World Report	9/10 (Plus) 9/10
Pocket Gamer	4/5
Shacknews	8/10
The Guardian	4/5
USgamer	4/5

Snipperclips received generally favorable reviews, according to review aggregator website Metacritic. IGN gave the game 8/10, praising the game's multiplayer experience and presentation. The Guardian described it as "addictive". Polygon stated that Snipperclips was "a tricky, tricky game of logic and cunning". The website later ranked it 48th on their list of the 50 best games of 2017. During their financial briefing in April 2017, Nintendo reported that over 350,000 digital copies of the game had been downloaded.

=== Awards and accolades ===
The game won IGN's award for best puzzle game of 2017, whereas its other nominations were for "Best Switch Game", "Most Innovative", and "Best Multiplayer". The game was also nominated for "Best Switch Game" at Destructoid's Game of the Year Awards 2017, for "Nintendo Game of the Year" at the Golden Joystick Awards, and for "Best Family/Social Game" at the Titanium Awards. In Game Informer's Reader's Choice Best of 2017 Awards, the game took the lead for "Best Puzzle Game". Snipperclips was also honored with "Family Game of the Year" and the "D.I.C.E. Sprite Award" at the 21st Annual D.I.C.E. Awards. It received nominations for "Game, Puzzle" at the National Academy of Video Game Trade Reviewers Awards, and for the British Academy Games Awards 2017 for Family Game and Game Innovation. At the 2019 Webby Awards, the game won the award for "Family & Kids Game", whereas its other nomination was for "Puzzle Game".
