= List of League of Legends media =

League of Legends logo

League of Legends is a multiplayer online battle arena video game developed and published by Riot Games. Announced in October 2008, it was released for Microsoft Windows in Europe and North America as a free-to-play title on October 27, 2009, after six months of beta testing. The game has since been ported to macOS and localized for markets worldwide; by 2012 it was the most played game in the world. League of Legends is often considered to be the biggest esport globally, with the 2020 League of Legends World Championship final peaking at 45.9 million concurrent viewers.

To commemorate the tenth anniversary of the game, Riot debuted several pieces of spin-off games, including a version for mobiles and consoles, a digital collectible card game named Legends of Runeterra, and a standalone mobile release of the auto battler game mode Teamfight Tactics. Later the same year, Riot announced Riot Forge, a publishing label for video games set in the League of Legends universe developed by third-party developers. After previously releasing the tabletop game Mechs vs. Minions in 2016, Riot made public a tabletop division in early 2020 along with its first title, which was released in September that year.

In addition to these games, many other forms of League of Legends media have been produced, such as books, music videos and short stories. Several soundtrack albums have been released for digital download and streaming, as well as two LP records. Bands composed of characters from the game have also released music, including the girl group K/DA, whose songs have topped Billboard's World Digital Song Sales chart. After releasing multiple one-shot comics on its website, Riot partnered with Marvel Comics in 2018 to create series of comics. The first – Ashe: Warmother – debuted that December, and was followed by Lux and Zed in 2019. Riot has also produced documentary films about the development and history of League of Legends, and premiered the animated television series Arcane on Netflix in 2021.

== Games ==
All games are developed and published by Riot Games, except where noted.

=== Video games ===
List of video games
Game	Details
League of Legends Original release dates: NA: October 27, 2009; EU: October 27, 2009; CN: September 22, 2011; KR: December 12, 2011	Release years by system: 2009 – Microsoft Windows; 2013 – macOS
League of Legends Original release dates: NA: October 27, 2009; EU: October 27, 2009; CN: September 22, 2011; KR: December 12, 2011	Notes: Free-to-play multiplayer online battle arena inspired by Defense of the Ancients; Riot's first game, developed since 2006 and announced on October 7, 2008; Published by Garena in Southeast Asia (until 2023 when Riot Games regain the publishing rights) and Tencent in China; originally published by Goa in Europe until Riot took over in May 2010; Entered closed beta on April 10, 2009 and open beta on October 22, 2009
Teamfight Tactics Original release dates: JP: June 25, 2019; OC: June 25, 2019; NA: June 26, 2019; EU: June 26, 2019	Release years by system: 2019 – macOS, Microsoft Windows; 2020 – Android, iOS
Teamfight Tactics Original release dates: JP: June 25, 2019; OC: June 25, 2019; NA: June 26, 2019; EU: June 26, 2019	Notes: Free-to-play auto battler inspired by Auto Chess; Released as a game mode within the League of Legends client on computers and standalone on mobiles, with cross-platform play
Legends of Runeterra Original release date: WW: April 30, 2020 (Note: Excluding China and Vietnam)	Release years by system: 2020 – Android, iOS, Microsoft Windows
Legends of Runeterra Original release date: WW: April 30, 2020	Notes: Free-to-play collectible card game; Released in "preview patches" in late 2019 before entering open beta on January 24, 2020 (Note: One day earlier for people who played during the preview patches or pre-registered before January 20)
League of Legends: Wild Rift Original release dates: (Note: Open beta release): AS: October 27, 2020 (Note: Indonesia, Japan, Malaysia, the Philippines, Singapore, South Korea and Thailand); EU: December 9, 2020; NA: March 28, 2021	Release years by system: 2020 – Android, iOS (open beta)
League of Legends: Wild Rift Original release dates: AS: October 27, 2020; EU: December 9, 2020; NA: March 28, 2021	Notes: Remade version of League of Legends, adapted for mobiles and consoles; The mobile version entered alpha testing in Brazil and the Philippines in June 2020, and closed beta in Southeast Asia in September 2020
Ruined King: A League of Legends Story Original release date(s): WW: November 16, 2021	Release years by system: 2021 – Microsoft Windows, Nintendo Switch, PlayStation 4, PlayStation 5, Xbox One, Xbox Series X/S
Ruined King: A League of Legends Story Original release date(s): WW: November 16, 2021	Notes: Turn-based role-playing game developed by Airship Syndicate and published by Riot Forge; First League of Legends game to be released on consoles
Hextech Mayhem: A League of Legends Story Original release date(s): WW: November 16, 2021	Release years by system: 2021 – Android, iOS, Microsoft Windows, Nintendo Switch
Hextech Mayhem: A League of Legends Story Original release date(s): WW: November 16, 2021	Notes: Rhythm game developed by Choice Provisions and published by Riot Forge and Netflix (Mobile versions)
League of Legends Esports Manager (Note: Chinese: 英雄联盟电竞经理; pinyin: Yīngxióng Liánméng Diàn Jìng Jīnglǐ) Original release date: CN: July 20, 2022	Release years by system: 2022 – Android, iOS
League of Legends Esports Manager Original release date: CN: July 20, 2022	Notes: Free-to-play sports management game developed and published by Tencent; Originally planned to launch for the 2020 League of Legends Pro League in China
The Mageseeker: A League of Legends Story Original release date(s): WW: April 18, 2023	Release years by system: 2023 – Microsoft Windows, Nintendo Switch, PlayStation 4, PlayStation 5, Xbox One, Xbox Series X/S
The Mageseeker: A League of Legends Story Original release date(s): WW: April 18, 2023	Notes: Linear action role-playing game developed by Digital Sun and published by Riot Forge
Convergence: A League of Legends Story Original release date(s): WW: May 23, 2023	Release years by system: 2023 – Microsoft Windows, Nintendo Switch, PlayStation 4, PlayStation 5, Xbox One, Xbox Series X/S
Convergence: A League of Legends Story Original release date(s): WW: May 23, 2023	Notes: Action platform game developed by Double Stallion Games and published by Riot Forge
Song of Nunu: A League of Legends Story Original release date(s): WW: November 1, 2023	Release years by system: 2023 – Microsoft Windows, Nintendo Switch; 2024 – PlayStation 4, PlayStation 5, Xbox One, Xbox Series X/S
Song of Nunu: A League of Legends Story Original release date(s): WW: November 1, 2023	Notes: Action-adventure puzzle game developed by Tequila Works and published by Riot Forge
Bandle Tale: A League of Legends Story Original release date(s): WW: February 21, 2024	Release years by system: 2024 – Microsoft Windows, Nintendo Switch
Bandle Tale: A League of Legends Story Original release date(s): WW: February 21, 2024	Notes: Crafting role-playing game developed by Lazy Bear Games and published by Riot Forge
2XKO Original release date(s): WW: January 20, 2026	Release years by system: 2026 – Microsoft Windows, PlayStation 5, Xbox Series X/S
2XKO Original release date(s): WW: January 20, 2026	Notes: Fighting game announced during Evo 2019; Revealed as Project L during the League of Legends 10th anniversary livestream

==== Upcoming ====
List of upcoming video games
Game	Details
Project F Proposed release date(s): TBA	Proposed system release: TBA
Project F Proposed release date(s): TBA	Notes: Multiplayer game announced in the League of Legends 10th anniversary livestream
Untitled MMORPG Proposed release date(s): TBA	Proposed system release: TBA
Untitled MMORPG Proposed release date(s): TBA	Notes: Massively multiplayer online role-playing game (MMORPG) revealed by Greg Street in December 2020

==== Minigames ====
List of minigames
Game	Details
League of Legends: Turret Defence Original release dates: EU: December 23, 2009; NA: December 24, 2009	Release years by system: 2009 – iOS
League of Legends: Turret Defence Original release dates: EU: December 23, 2009; NA: December 24, 2009	Notes: Free tower defense game developed by Goa/Orange Labs and Riot Games; published by Goa in Europe; Removed from the App Store in 2010
Cho'Gath Eats the World Original release date: WW: April 1, 2013	Release years by system: 2013 – Browser
Cho'Gath Eats the World Original release date: WW: April 1, 2013	Notes: Free Rampage-like arcade game developed by Pure Bang Games; April Fool's prank available only for one day; Includes Astro Teemo, an unlockable Jetpack Joyride-like endless runner game
Pixel Poro Original release date: WW: May 13, 2014	Release years by system: 2014 – Browser
Pixel Poro Original release date: WW: May 13, 2014	Notes: Pong-like game released to coincide with the launch of the new champion Braum
Blitzcrank's Poro Roundup Original release date: WW: August 20, 2015	Release years by system: 2015 – Android, Browser, iOS
Blitzcrank's Poro Roundup Original release date: WW: August 20, 2015	Notes: Free arcade side-scrolling game developed by Pure Bang Games; Only available for a limited time, until September 21, 2015
Thunderdome games Original release dates: WW: August 18, 2017; WW: March 16, 2018	Release years by system: 2017 – Microsoft Windows; 2018 – Microsoft Windows
Thunderdome games Original release dates: WW: August 18, 2017; WW: March 16, 2018	Notes: Free unofficial games developed in 48 hours during Riot's yearly "Thunderdome" hackathon: Demacia Vice Squad (2017), a beat 'em up game; Super Arcade Gunners X (2017), a twin-stick shooter; Ziggs Arcade Blast (2017), a side-scrolling platform game; Star Guardian: Insomnia (2018), a bullet hell side-scroller; Super Zac Ball (2018), a sports arcade game; PROJECT.EXEcute (2018), a twin-stick shooter

=== Tabletop games ===
List of tabletop games
Game	Details
Mechs vs. Minions October 13, 2016 – Tabletop game	Notes: Co-operative strategy game that began as a passion project within Riot Games; Took three years to develop
Tellstones: King's Gambit September 16, 2020 – Tabletop game	Notes: Memory game where players compete to remember the symbols of seven stones placed face-down in a line; First title by Riot Tabletop, a division of Riot Games announced in January 2020
Riftbound October 31, 2025 – Trading card game	Notes: Published by UVS Games worldwide, Shining Soul in China

== Applications ==
List of applications
Game	Details
League+ Original release date: February 24, 2016	Release years by system: 2016 – Android, iOS
League+ Original release date: February 24, 2016	Notes: Mobile app for chatting with friends, receiving game and esports news and watching esports and streamers; Originally released as League Friends with only chatting functionality
League Displays Original release date: December 4, 2017	Release years by system: 2017 – macOS, Microsoft Windows
League Displays Original release date: December 4, 2017	Notes: Desktop app for downloading high-definition wallpapers and screensavers of League of Legends artwork; Replaced and expanded on the functionality of the earlier beta app League Screensaver

== Music ==
=== Soundtracks ===
List of soundtrack albums
Title	Release date	Length	Label
The Music of League of Legends Vol. 1	January 27, 2015	51:24	Riot Games
The Music of League of Legends: Season 1	October 15, 2019	28:28	Riot Games
The Music of League of Legends: Season 2	October 15, 2019	1:09:43	Riot Games
The Music of League of Legends: Season 3	October 15, 2019	48:30	Riot Games
The Music of League of Legends: Season 4	October 15, 2019	1:18:31	Riot Games
The Music of League of Legends: Season 5	October 15, 2019	1:09:38	Riot Games
The Music of League of Legends: Season 6	October 15, 2019	1:28:57	Riot Games
The Music of League of Legends: Season 7	October 15, 2019	2:08:03	Riot Games
The Music of League of Legends: Season 8	October 15, 2019	1:28:52	Riot Games
The Music of League of Legends: Season 9	October 15, 2019	55:18	Riot Games
League of Legends: Wild Rift (Original Soundtrack)	March 30, 2021	26:01	Riot Games

==== Vinyl records ====
List of soundtrack albums released on vinyl
Title	Release date	Length	Label
League of Legends: Selected Orchestral Works	October 16, 2019	1:23:22	Riot Games/iam8bit
Notes: Double LP record released by iam8bit, containing 26 tracks
DJ Sona: Ultimate Concert	December 5, 2019	37:12	Riot Games/iam8bit
Notes: LP record released by iam8bit, containing 7 tracks featuring Bassnectar, The Crystal Method, Pretty Lights, Dada Life, Nosaj Thing and Renholdër

=== Remixes ===
List of remix albums
Title	Release date	Length	Label
Warsongs	January 14, 2016	46:53	Riot Games
Notes: Remix album containing 11 EDM remixes by Marshmello, Arty, MitiS, James Egbert, Mako, Hyper Potions, ProtoShredanoid, Jauz, Minnesota, Dan Negovan and Vicetone

=== Virtual bands ===
Albums and EPs released by virtual bands composed of League of Legends champions.

List of albums and EPs by virtual bands
Title	Release date	Length	Label
Smite and Ignite	June 3, 2014	30:27	Riot Games
Notes: Debut album by heavy metal band Pentakill, containing 8 tracks; Features vocals from Jørn Lande and ZP Theart
II: Grasp of the Undying	August 3, 2017	45:56	Riot Games
Notes: Second album by Pentakill, containing 10 tracks; Features vocals from Jørn Lande, Noora Louhimo (from Battle Beast), Danny Lohner and Per Johansson
All Out	November 6, 2020	16:16	Riot Games
Notes: Debut EP by girl group K/DA, containing 5 tracks; released as a follow-up to their 2018 debut single "Pop/Stars"; Features vocals from (G)I-dle, Bea Miller, Wolftyla, Madison Beer, Lexie Liu, Jaira Burns, Kim Petras, Bekuh Boom, Aluna, Twice and Annika Wells; Was preceded by the release of the singles "The Baddest" and "More"
III: Lost Chapter	September 8, 2021	46:05	Riot Games
Notes: Third album by Pentakill, containing 11 tracks; Features vocals from Jørn Lande, Noora Louhimo (from Battle Beast), Tyler "Telle" Smith and Tre Watson

== Literature ==
=== Books ===
List of books
Title	Release date	Publisher
The Art of League of Legends: Volume I	September 2, 2016	Riot Games
Notes: Art book released as part of the 10th anniversary of Riot Games; Released as both a printed book (ISBN 978-0-997-40110-3) and a free ebook
Realms of Runeterra	November 5, 2019	Voracious
Notes: Encyclopedic companion book to League of Legends, detailing the world with stories and illustrations (ISBN 978-0-316-49732-9)
Garen: First Shield	December 8, 2020	Riot Games
Notes: Novella written by Anthony Reynolds, released as an ebook
Ruination: A League of Legends Novel	September 6, 2022	Orbit Books
Notes: Novel written by Anthony Reynolds; Released as a printed book (ISBN 978-0-316-46905-0) and ebook

=== Comics ===
==== Series ====
List of comic series
Title	Release dates	Publisher
Ashe: Warmother	December 19, 2018 – March 20, 2019	Marvel Comics
Notes: Written by Odin Austin Shafer, with art by Nina Vakueva (cover art by Yasmine Putri); Published in 4 issues; a collected trade paperback was released on May 15, 2019 (ISBN 978-1-302-91856-9).
Lux	May 8 – September 11, 2019	Marvel Comics
Notes: Written by John O'Bryan, with art by Billy Tan, Haining and Gadson of Tan Comics; Published in 5 issues; a collected trade paperback was released on November 6, 2019 (ISBN 978-1-302-91943-6).
Zed	November 20, 2019 – April 15, 2020	Marvel Comics
Notes: Written by Odin Austin Shafer, with art by Edgar Salazar, Lorenzo Ruggiero, Andres Mossa and Chris O'halloran; Published in 6 issues; a collected trade paperback was released on September 30, 2020 (ISBN 978-1-302-91947-4).
K/DA: Harmonies	September 5 – October 3, 2020	Riot Games
Notes: Webtoon written by Michael Yichao, with art by HD of Rainforest Culture; Published in 5 issues before the release of the All Out EP

==== One-shots ====
One-shot comics published on the League of Legends Universe website.

List of comic one-shots
Title	Release date	Publisher
Darius: Blood of Noxus	August 18, 2017	Riot Games
Nami: Into the Abyss	September 1, 2017	Riot Games
Ziggs & Jinx: Paint the Town	September 15, 2017	Riot Games
Miss Fortune: Fortune Smiles	September 29, 2017	Riot Games
Varus: Heartlight	November 30, 2017	Riot Games
Varus: Retribution	November 30, 2017	Riot Games
Ryze: The Burning Lands	July 25, 2018	Riot Games

== Television and film ==
List of television series and films
Title	Release date(s)	Original network
Frequencies – The Music of League of Legends	January 28, 2015	YouTube
Notes: Documentary film about the composers of League of Legends and the production of The Music of League of Legends Vol. 1, directed by Caleb Slain
League of Legends Origins	October 15, 2019	Netflix
Notes: Documentary film about the history of the game and its community, directed by Leslie Iwerks
Tales of Runeterra	April 6, 2020 – January 8, 2021	YouTube
Notes: Series of animated short films focusing on different regions of the League of Legends universe and their characters
Arcane	November 6, 2021 – November 23, 2024	Netflix
Notes: Animated series centering on the sisters Vi and Jinx, produced by Riot Games and Fortiche; First season initially set to be released in 2020, but was pushed back to 2021 due to the COVID-19 pandemic. Second and final season released in 2024.
