= Riot Games =

American video game developer

Riot Games, Inc.
- Logo used since 2022

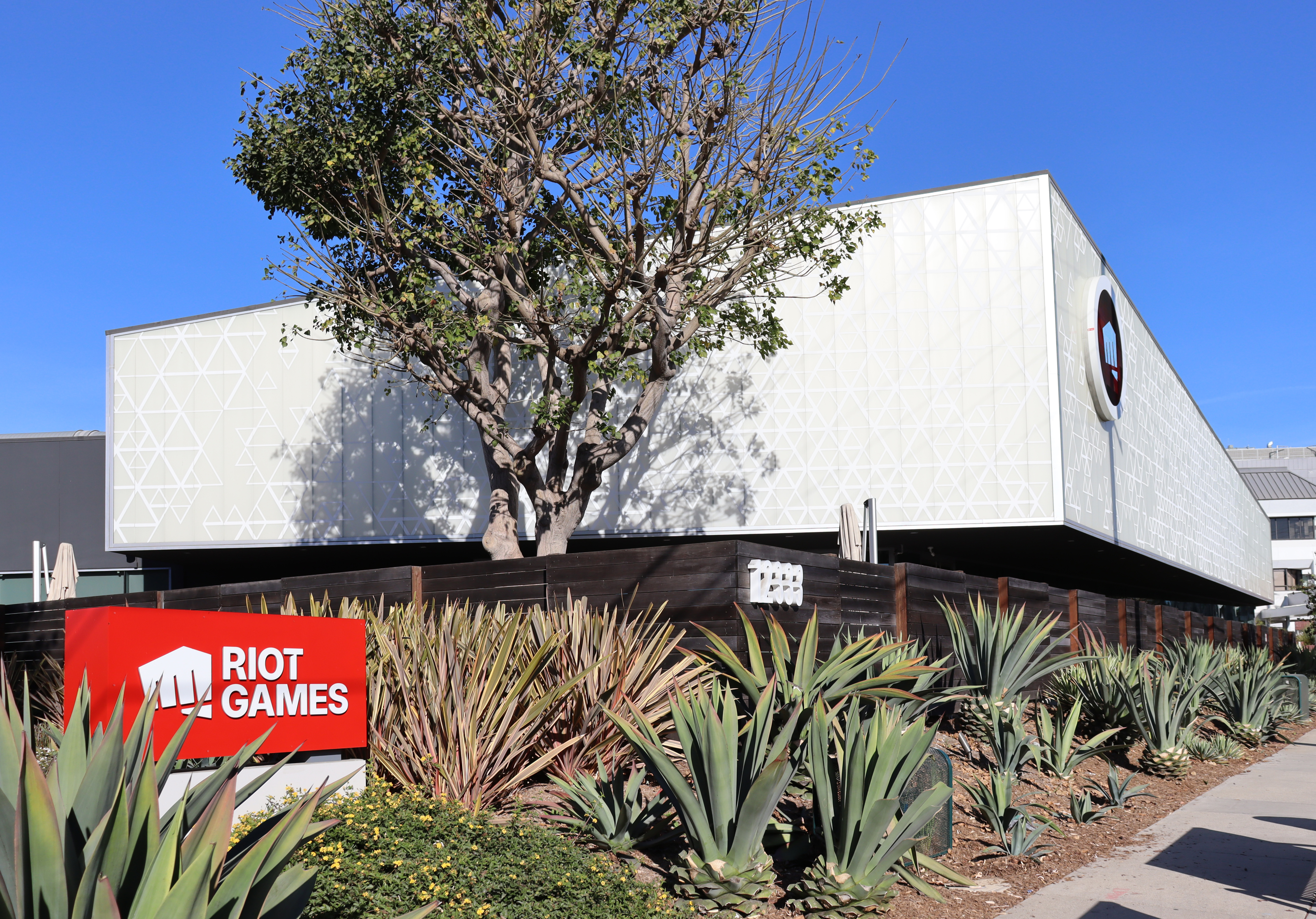
- Riot Games' West Los Angeles headquarters (pictured in January 2025)
- Type: Subsidiary
- Industry: Video games
- Founded: September 2006; 20 years ago in Santa Monica, California, US
- Founders: Brandon Beck; Marc Merrill
- Headquarters: Los Angeles, US
- Number of locations: 21 offices (2026)
- Key people: Brandon Beck (co-chairman); Marc Merrill (co-chairman, CPO); Dylan Jadeja (CEO); Hoby Darling (president); Mark Sottosanti (CFO)
- Products: League of Legends; League of Legends: Wild Rift; Legends of Runeterra; Riftbound; Teamfight Tactics; Valorant; 2XKO
- Number of employees: 4,200+ (2024)
- Parent: Tencent (2011–present)
- Divisions: Riot Tabletop
- Subsidiaries: Radiant Entertainment; Riot Sydney
- ASN: 6507
- Website: riotgames.com

Riot Games, Inc. is an American video game developer, publisher, and esports tournament organizer based in Los Angeles. It was founded in September 2006 by Brandon Beck and Marc Merrill to develop League of Legends and went on to develop several spin-off games and the unrelated first-person shooter game Valorant. In 2011, Riot Games was acquired by Chinese conglomerate Tencent. Its publishing arm, Riot Forge, oversaw the production of League of Legends spin-offs by other developers until its shutdown in January 2024. The company worked with Fortiche to release Arcane, a television series based on the League of Legends universe.

Riot Games operates League of Legends esports leagues and the Valorant Champions Tour. The company, which had 21 offices worldwide as of 2026, sells corporate sponsorships, merchandise, and streaming rights for its leagues. Riot has faced allegations and lawsuits alleging a toxic workplace culture, including gender discrimination and sexual harassment. The company was criticized for its use of forced arbitration in response to these allegations.

== History ==
Brandon "Ryze" Beck and Marc "Tryndamere" Merrill, the founders of Riot Games, became friends while roommates at the University of Southern California, where the two studied business. Beck and Merrill believed too many video game developers diverted their focus from game to game too often, distinguishing Defense of the Ancients as an indication that games could be supported and monetized long-term. They also drew inspiration from Asian video game designers who released their games for no up-front cost, and instead charged for additional perks.

Beck and Merrill sought funding from family and angel investors, raising US$1.5 million to launch their company. Riot Games was established in September 2006 in Santa Monica, California. The first person Riot Games recruited was Steve "Guinsoo" Feak, one of the early developers of DotA Allstars, a game considered to have been foundational to the MOBA genre. As they refined League of Legends' initial creation, they pitched investors a video game company rooted in e-commerce. Merrill said that they approached publishers who were baffled by the game's lack of a single-player mode and free-to-play business model. Riot Games received several rounds of funding totaling $8 million, including investments by the Benchmark and FirstMark Capital venture capital firms, as well as Chinese holding company Tencent. The latter would later become League of Legends' distributor in China, and then the parent company of Riot Games.

Following six months of beta tests, Riot Games released League of Legends as a free-to-play game on October 27, 2009. Their game designers and executives participated in online forums to make adjustments based on player feedback. On May 10, 2010, Riot Games announced that they would take over distribution and operation of their game in Europe; to do so, Riot Games relocated their European headquarters in Brighton to new offices in Dublin. In February 2011, Tencent invested $400 million for a 93 percent stake in Riot Games. Tencent bought the remaining 7 percent on December 16, 2015; the price was not disclosed.

In 2012, in response to toxicity and harassment in League of Legends, Riot Games launched a "player behavior team" of psychologists to combat harassment on its platform. Riot Games' tactics to address issues on League of Legends, which included an opt-in chat function between opposing players, informing banned players of the reasoning behind the ban, as well as creating a tribunal of players to weigh in on bans, resulted in a 30 percent drop in reported harassment behavior. The efficacy of their results has been questioned by players and the gaming press. By 2013, League of Legends was the most-played multiplayer PC game in the world. By 2016, Inc. reported the game had over 100 million monthly players.

Riot Games relocated to a new building on a 20-acre (8-hectare) campus in western Los Angeles in 2015. In March 2016, Riot Games acquired Radiant Entertainment, another developer who was working on Rising Thunder and Stonehearth at the time. Rising Thunder was effectively canceled following the acquisition, with the game's team allocated to a new project.

On October 13, 2017, Beck and Merrill announced that they were returning their focus to developing games, aiming to create new experiences for video game and esports players. Beck and Merrill handed over the day-to-day operations and overall management of the League of Legends team to three longtime employees: Dylan Jadeja, Scott Gelb, and Nicolo Laurent, who previously served as chief financial officer (CFO), chief technology officer (CTO) and president, respectively. Subsequently, Gelb and Laurent assumed roles as chief operating officer (COO) and chief executive officer (CEO), respectively, while Beck and Merrill became the Riot Games' chairmen. As of May 2018, Riot Games employed 2,500 people, operating 24 offices around the world.

In October 2019, Riot Games announced several new games: a version of League of Legends for mobile devices and consoles called League of Legends: Wild Rift, a standalone mobile version of the Teamfight Tactics mode from League of Legends, and the digital collectible card game titled Legends of Runeterra, with all three scheduled for a 2020 release. (Note: League of Legends: Wild Rift was delayed as a result of the COVID-19 pandemic.) The company also teased further games — Project A, a tactical shooter; Project L, a fighting game with League of Legends characters; and Project F, a multiplayer game set in Runeterra – that were not detailed outside of genre descriptions and brief gameplay clips. Project A was later revealed to be Valorant, which entered closed beta on April 7, 2020 and was officially released on June 2, 2020.

In December 2019, Riot Games announced Riot Forge, a publishing label headed by Leanne Loombe. The label partnered with smaller game development studios for the creation of League of Legends games, with some games of this type already being in development. Two titles from Riot Forge were announced at The Game Awards 2019: Ruined King: A League of Legends Story by Airship Syndicate, and Convergence: A League of Legends Story by Double Stallion Games. Another division, Riot Tabletop, was announced in January 2020, to produce tabletop games; the first was Tellstones: King's Gambit, released in 2020.

Riot acquired Hypixel Studios in April 2020, which it had been investing in over the previous eighteen months to help it publish Hytale, a voxel-based sandbox game. Also in April, Riot announced plans to establish a Singapore office later that year. Riot Games Singapore is to support Riot's existing titles and will have a major focus on developing the company's newer titles. Jason Bunge was hired as Riot Games' chief marketing officer in October 2020. In October 2021, the company bought Kanga, a services firm involved in "fan hubs", merchandising, and content aggregation.

Riot Games collaborated with French animation studio Fortiche to release an animated series, Arcane. The series was released worldwide in November 2021 on Netflix, and by parent company Tencent in China, and received a favorable critical reception.

In March 2022, Riot Games announced that it had invested in Fortiche and, as a result, its chief content officer Brian Wright and director of corporate development Brendan Mulligan were joining Fortiche's board of directors. That same month, Riot also hired executives from Netflix, Paramount, and HBO Max to head development of film, TV, and music endeavors built around the company's intellectual property.

In October 2022, Riot acquired Wargaming Sydney—a subsidiary of Cyprus-based Wargaming that had originally developed the MMO middleware BigWorld—for an undisclosed amount, and renamed it Riot Sydney. The acquisition excludes rights to the BigWorld technology itself, as well as its publishing arm.

In January 2023, Riot Games cut 46 employees in a round of layoffs. In the same month, it suffered a cyberattack that stole source code for League of Legends, Teamfight Tactics, and an anti-cheat platform. The hackers in question put the stolen data up for sale on the dark web for US$700,000. In 2023, several games under the Riot Forge label were released, including The Mageseeker by Digital Sun, and Song of Nunu by Tequila Works. In September 2023, Dylan Jadeja became company CEO.

Riot announced in January 2024 that it would be laying off 530 employees, or about 11% of its workforce, as well as sunsetting the Riot Forge effort as well as its planned Twitch competitor, Riot Esports Network (REN). Jadeja stated the rationale for the layoffs: "A decision like this has a massive impact on people's lives and on the culture of Riot. We're not doing this to appease shareholders or to hit some quarterly earnings number – we've made this decision because it's a necessity. It's what we need to do in order to maintain a long-term focus for players." In May 2024, the company was sued in the California federal court over its partnership with bankrupt cryptocurrency exchange FTX. Lawyers for the plaintiff said the claims were brought as their losses from FTX could not be recovered due to the bankruptcy proceedings.

In June 2025, Riot Games announced the closure of Hypixel Studios, the development team behind the sandbox game Hytale, which the company acquired in 2020. After years of development, including a major engine rewrite and a delayed beta originally slated for 2021. Hypixel CEO Aaron Donaghey confirmed that the project could not be completed in a way that honored the original vision, leading to both the cancellation of Hytale and the phased wind‑down of Hypixel Studios.

== Esports ==
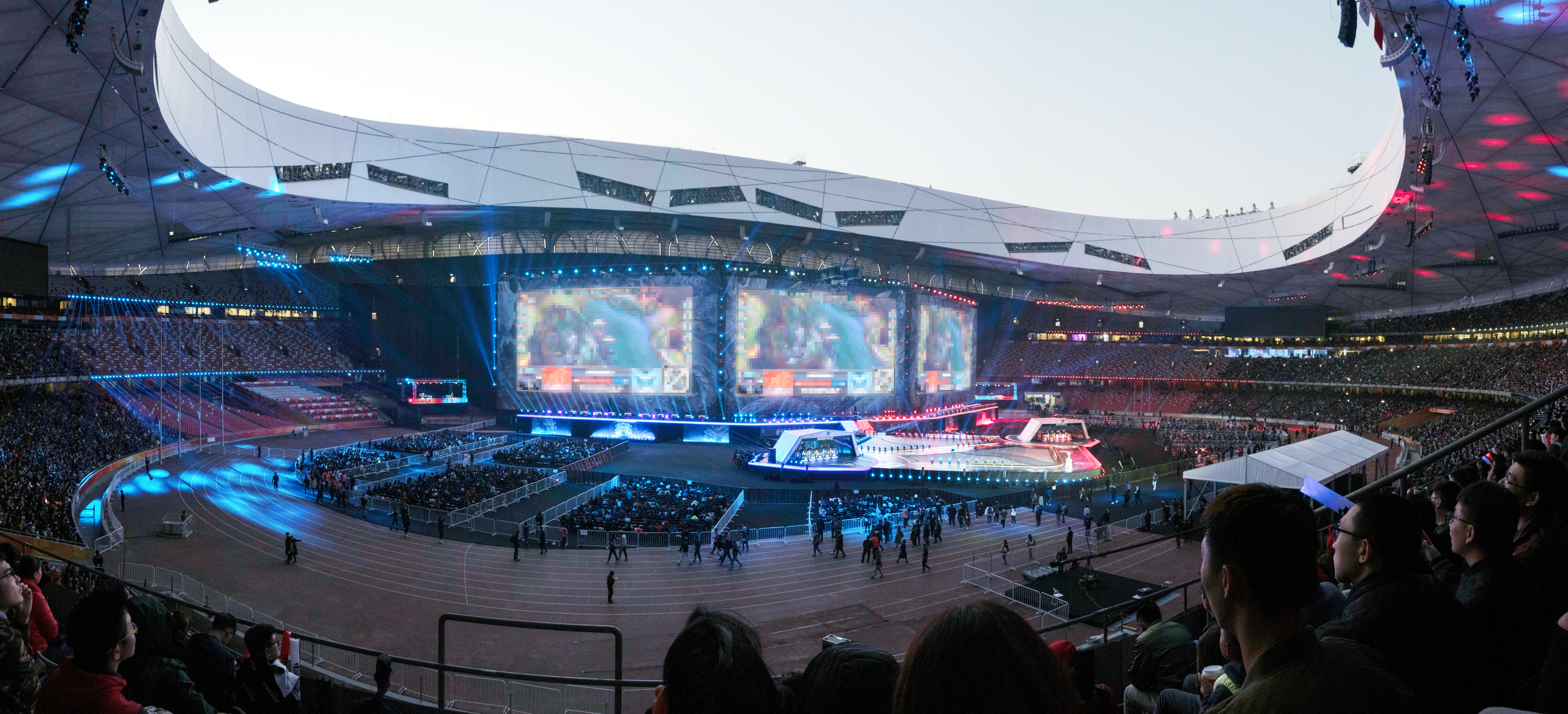
The stage for the 2017 League of Legends World Championship finals between SK Telecom T1 and Samsung Galaxy in the Beijing National Stadium

Riot Games operates esports leagues worldwide. This includes the League of Legends Championship Series, comprising leagues in North America and Europe. In total, there are more than 100 teams in Riot Games' 12 regional leagues around the world. Teams compete over the course of a season separated into two seasonal splits. Teams earn championship points to qualify for two major international competitions: the Mid-Season Invitational and the League of Legends World Championship. Riot Games' World Championship is the annual professional tournament at the conclusion of each season.

During 2010 and 2011, the Riot Games team developed new content for League of Legends; it was during this time that the company realized that people also liked to watch the game being played. As a result, Riot Games established its own League of Legends esports leagues which produce weekly broadcasts and create a professional game schedule. Following Riot Games' first world championship event in 2011, a small affair at a conference in Sweden, the company decided to turn their tournaments into professional sports-like events. It invested in broadcasting equipment, hired sports programming producers, and trained pro gamers to be "TV-ready". In 2012, Riot Games held its tournament at University of Southern California's Galen Center, offering $1 million in prize money. Riot Games has since held tournaments in Berlin, Seoul, Madison Square Garden in New York City, and the Staples Center in Los Angeles.

The company sells corporate sponsorships, merchandise, and streaming rights for its esports league. In 2015, investors bought stakes in teams and began building their own squads. Among the team owners in Riot Games' leagues are the owners of the Washington Wizards, Cleveland Cavaliers, Houston Rockets, Golden State Warriors, Philadelphia 76ers, Los Angeles Dodgers, AOL co-founder Steve Case, and life coach Tony Robbins. Inc. cited the growth of the leagues and high-profile ownership as part of its reasoning for making Riot Games its 2016 Company of the Year. Following debates over whether pro players and coaches should have a greater share of Riot Games' esports revenue and concerns raised about the company making in-game changes prior to matches, the company issued an open letter in 2016 promising higher revenue shares and more collaboration with professional teams. In 2017, Riot Games held the League of Legends World Championship in China, with the finals taking place in Beijing. The same year, the company announced it would franchise its ten-team North American League of Legends Championship Series, which cost at least $10 million to enter.

In November 2020, Riot Games announced the first Valorant Champions Tour, the global competitive tournament for Valorant. In 2021, Riot began building out three new "remote broadcast centers" in Asia, North America (Seattle), and Europe (Dublin), as part of an effort to improve the scale of its esports productions using a centralized production model with regional hubs. The facilities would be capable of both on-site productions, and allowing regional productions to connect to the facilities' datacenters and use its infrastructure as part of remote productions. The three locations were chosen as their time zones are each eight hours apart, allowing them to "work a full shift and then shut down and throw control for the next productions to the next facility." The first RBC in Dublin, Ireland, opened in July 2022, in a building formerly housed by the nightclub The Wright Venue in Swords; it has an IP-based infrastructure, six studios, and preserves the nightclub's disco ball (which had been promoted as the largest in Europe). As part of its buildout of the LoL series, Riot partnered with the FTX cryptocurrency exchange in August 2021 for a seven-year deal. Following the bankruptcy of FTX in November 2022, Riot began to seek legal methods to terminate the FTX contract.

== Criticism and controversies ==
=== Allegations over gender discrimination and sexual harassment ===
Over the first half of 2018, Kotaku spoke to about 28 former and current employees at Riot Games. Several employees claimed that female employees at Riot were being discriminated against. For example, some noted that ideas from female employees were overlooked while the same ideas from male employees were readily accepted, and some female employees were groomed for more senior positions only to be passed up by a new male hire. These employees described Riot's working environment as a "bro culture". Other allegations included receiving images of male genitalia from colleagues and bosses, an email thread speculating on what it would be like to penetrate a female employee, and a list shared among senior staff members detailing which female employees they would sleep with. Kotaku speculated that this came from Riot's history of generally catering to "core" gamers both in products and in hiring practices, causing the company to favor male employees over female employees.

Some Riot employees approached by Kotaku asserted these accusations were not true or were already being addressed; for example, according to the head of the platform, Oksana Kubushyna, efforts to improve the hiring process to be more diverse and inclusive toward women started nine months before article's publication. Riot Games' corporate communications lead Joe Hixson acknowledged the problems and said they did not align with Riot's core values. Furthermore, he said that all Riot employees must be held accountable for the working environment.

In the week following Kotaku's article, several more current and former developers came forward to speak on their own experiences at Riot, which included claims of sexual harassment and misgendering. In a statement to Gamasutra, Hixson indicated that the company is taking action based on the story and its response. He elaborated that, in regards to claims of misbehavior by higher-level executives at Riot, the seniority of the individuals would have no impact on disciplinary proceedings. By the end of August 2018, Riot revealed it was implementing seven "first steps" to change the company's internal culture in light of the issues raised, including a "Culture and Diversity & Inclusion Initiative" priority. To help implement these, Riot hired Frances X. Frei as a senior adviser for diversity, leadership, and strategy.

As a response to the Kotaku article, Riot offered a session at PAX West in 2018 for prospective video game developers with a panel and one-on-one sessions to review résumés; the session only admitted women and non-binary people. Members of Riot's game communities expressed outrage at the exclusion of men, while Riot employees defended the decision as such gender-exclusive support was necessary to correct the male-dominated nature of video game development. Some of the feedback towards Riot included harassment and threats. In response to a shooting at a video game tournament in Jacksonville, Florida, in August 2018, Riot planned to increase security at its upcoming events. Two employees of Riot attempted to address the feedback from the PAX event; one was fired, and the other left the company. Riot stated that these departures were separate from its Diversity Initiative.

In December 2018, Riot's CEO Nicolo Laurent sent an email to all employees stating that following the company's internal investigation, its COO, Scott Gelb, was suspended for two months without pay for workplace misconduct and would take training classes before his return. Riot stated to Kotaku that there were still other cases it was investigating, but they did not involve those as senior as Gelb, and thus it would not discuss these cases publicly. By January 2019, Riot updated the company values on its website, the first time since 2012, to reflect the apparent "bro culture" mentioned in the Kotaku report, and by February 2019, had hired Angela Roseboro as the company's chief diversity officer to further help improve its culture by managing all activity related to diversity and inclusion as well as guiding the recruiting team in promoting inclusivity for new hires.

About three months after Kotaku's story, one current and one former Riot employee filed a lawsuit against the company, asserting the company engaged in gender discrimination concerning their pay and position, and that the company had created a "sexually-hostile" workplace. The lawsuit seeks to qualify it as a class-action suit, and for damages to be based on unpaid wages, damages, and other factors to be determined at trial. Three other employees followed with their own lawsuits against Riot Games in the months that followed. Riot Games attempted to have two of the suits dismissed in April 2019, citing that the two female plaintiffs of these suits, when hired, had agreed to third-party arbitration rather than taking court action. Internally, several employees of Riot threatened to walk out, an idea that had been around since the first Kotaku article, as alongside the coercion to use arbitration, these employees felt Riot had yet to improve its transparency on the processes and had otherwise continued to retain Gelb despite his suspension.

A proposed settlement was reached in the class-action suit in August 2019, which would include at least US$10 million in damages to women that had been employed at Riot Games over the prior five years. Representatives of the class indicated that they thought it would lead to change, while Riot said that there were other issues not covered by the suit, and that it also intended to resolve the unacknowledged issues.

California's Department of Fair Employment and Housing (DFEH) had been investigating claims of gender discrimination at Riot Games since October 2018. In June 2019, DFEH announced that Riot had denied providing them requested documents and were seeking action to compel these documents, though Riot responded by saying that it complied with all DFEH requests. Upon word of the settlement, the department filed a complaint with the court that stated they believed the settlement was far too low, estimating that the lawsuit potentially could have been worth as much as US$400 million. The state's Division of Labor Standards Enforcement also filed a complaint, believing the settlement would release Riot from labor liabilities that had been raised by the lawsuit. Both complaints urged the court to reject the proposed settlement. Riot dismissed the DFEH's larger value to the suit, and denied charges raised by the DFEH that it had colluded with the class's lawyer to reduce the amount it would pay through the settlement.

As a result of the state's findings that the terms of the settlement should have been valued higher, the class withdrew the proposed US$10 million settlement and dropped their original legal counsel, bringing on new lawyers who had been involved in prior lawsuits related to the Me Too movement in February 2020. In response, Riot said it found the US$10 million figure "fair and adequate under the circumstances" after analysis, but were remaining committed to reaching a resolution. In August 2021, DFEH asserted that Riot was interfering in their ongoing investigations by falsely informing employees that they could not speak to DFEH directly; while the court ordered Riot to issue a memo to all employees that they legally could speak to DFEH, Riot had yet to comply with this order. By the end of 2021, Riot had agreed to a new settlement with the DFEH and employees of $100 million, with $80 million going to the impacted employees. The settlement was approved in July 2022. Riot will compensate 1,548 female employees between $2,500 and $40,000 each as part of the settlement.

Riot and Laurent were sued by Laurent's former assistant in January 2021 on sexual discrimination charges, which included inappropriate language and labor mistreatment. Riot opened an investigation by three members of its board of directors into Laurent's behavior in response to the lawsuit. They reported in March 2021 that "We concluded that there was no evidence that Laurent harassed, discriminated, or retaliated against the plaintiff. We have therefore concluded that at the current time … no action should be taken against Laurent."

Alienware, which had sponsored Riot's League of Legends esports events, ended its partnership with Riot a year earlier than their contract term in March 2021 due to the ongoing litigation over the sexual harassment allegations.

==== Dispute over forced arbitration clauses ====
Riot has also been criticized by its employees for requiring the use of forced arbitration in its employment contracts as a result of the gender discrimination lawsuit. Riot allowed employees to speak anonymously with the press, and indicated its intent to use town hall meetings and smaller group discussions with Roseboro and employees to determine future action. Riot also committed to removing mandatory arbitration in new employee contracts and potentially for existing ones after the current litigation had been settled. Additionally, Riot established a 90-day plan starting in May 2019 to continue to address internal issues related to diversity and inclusion. Despite this, over one hundred Riot employees staged their walkout on May 6, 2019, demanding that Riot end forced arbitration for all past and current employees as well. About two weeks following the walkout, Riot reverted its position, saying that it will not change forced arbitration in existing agreements while the current litigation against the company is ongoing.

=== Others ===
==== Freedom of expression ====
In the context of the 2019–2020 Hong Kong protests, Riot Games took action to discourage political statements during its live events, claiming that overt statements on politics, religion, and other sensitive topics "cannot be fairly represented in the forum [their] broadcast provides", and has asserted that the company bears responsibility for ensuring "that statements or actions on [their] official platforms [...] do not escalate potentially sensitive situations."

In 2019, players discovered that words that are politically sensitive in China, including Tiananmen and Uyghur, were censored in League of Legends. The censorship varied by server and language, with some restrictions being lifted after complaints were posted to Reddit.

==== George Floyd ====
In June 2020, Ron Johnson, Riot Games' global head of consumer products, shared a Facebook post that claimed George Floyd had been murdered by police "because of his criminal lifestyle". The company subsequently placed Johnson on leave to conduct an investigation, after which Johnson resigned from the company.

==== Sponsorship with Saudi Arabian city ====
Riot had announced a planned partnership with the developing city of Neom in Saudi Arabia in July 2020, with the city to sponsor the upcoming League of Legends European Championship series. Shortly after the announcement, fans of the game, as well as Riot employees, criticized the company over social media and their streaming channels over the partnership, citing Saudi Arabia's record on human rights and the violent attempts to evict the Howeitat tribe from the area during the city's construction. Riot canceled the partnership within a few days in response, apologizing and saying that the partnership had been rushed.

==== Marketing using a character’s mental health struggles ====
Riot was criticized for marketing a new League of Legends character, Seraphine, by creating an in-character Twitter account in which it alluded to her struggles with her mental health, including low self-esteem, anxiety, and impostor syndrome. Some wrote that the account was an attempt to trick players into feeling close to her in an attempt to advertise. Creative director Patrick Morales said that, although he was "proud" of the members of the team who worked on the campaign, it had "an unintended impact outside of the narrative we wanted to tell".

==== Response to Russian invasion of Ukraine ====
After Russia launched an invasion of Ukraine in February 2022, Riot Games did not withdraw from the Russian market after being asked to do so by Ukrainian politician Mykhailo Fedorov. In March 2022, Riot donated the proceeds from battle passes sold in several of its games, as well as profit from some in-game items, to humanitarian relief organizations operating in Ukraine. According to Riot, these donations totaled $5.4 million.

== Litigation ==
In 2017, Riot Games filed a lawsuit against Moonton Technology Co., the developer of the mobile game Mobile Legends: Bang Bang, because of copyright infringement, citing similarities between Mobile Legends and League of Legends. The case was initially dismissed in California on account of forum non conveniens. Tencent, on behalf of Riot Games, then filed a new lawsuit in a Chinese court, which ruled in Tencent's favor in July 2018, awarding it $2.9 million in damages.

In October 2019, Riot Games filed a lawsuit against Riot Squad Esports LLC, a Chicago-based esports organization founded in March 2019, alleging that Riot Squad intentionally infringed on Riot Games' "Riot" trademark.

== Games ==
Year	Title	Genre(s)	Platform(s)	Ref.
2009	League of Legends	Multiplayer online battle arena	macOS, Windows	
2019	Teamfight Tactics	Auto battler	Android, iOS, macOS, Windows	
2020	League of Legends: Wild Rift	Multiplayer online battle arena	Android, iOS	
2020	Legends of Runeterra	Digital collectible card game	Android, iOS, Windows	
2020	Valorant	First-person shooter	PlayStation 5, Windows, Xbox Series X/S	
2024	Golden Spatula	Auto battler	Android, iOS	
2026	2XKO	Fighting	PlayStation 5, Windows, Xbox Series X/S	
TBA	LoL Esports Manager	Simulation	Android, iOS, Windows	
TBA	Project F	Action role-playing, hack and slash	TBA	
TBA	Untitled Runeterra MMO	MMORPG	TBA	

=== Minigames ===
Year	Title	Genre(s)	Platform(s)	Developer(s)
2013	Astro Teemo	Arcade	Browser	Pure Bang Games
2014	Cho'Gath Eats the World	Arcade	Browser	Pure Bang Games
2015	Blitzcrank's Poro Roundup	Arcade	Android, iOS	Pure Bang Games
2017	Ziggs Arcade Blast	Arcade	Windows	Riot Games
2018	Star Guardian: Insomnia	Shoot 'em up	Windows	Riot Games
2018	Project.execute	Shoot 'em up	Windows	Riot Games
2018	Super Zac Ball	Sports	Windows	Riot Games

=== Riot Forge ===
Year	Title	Developer	Genre(s)	Platform(s)	Ref.
2021	Ruined King	Airship Syndicate	Role-playing	Nintendo Switch, PlayStation 4, Windows, Xbox One	
2021	Hextech Mayhem	Choice Provisions	Rhythm	Nintendo Switch, Windows	
2023	Convergence	Double Stallion	Action platformer	PlayStation 4/5, Xbox One, Xbox Series X/S, Nintendo Switch, Windows	
2023	Song of Nunu	Tequila Works	Adventure	PlayStation 4/5, Xbox One, Xbox Series X/S, Nintendo Switch, Windows	
2023	The Mageseeker	Digital Sun	Pixel art action RPG	Nintendo Switch, PlayStation 4, PlayStation 5, Windows, Xbox One, Xbox Series X/S	
2024	Bandle Tale	Lazy Bear Games	Role-playing farming simulation	Nintendo Switch, Windows	

=== Tabletop games ===
In October 2016, Riot Games released Mechs vs. Minions, a cooperative tabletop game based on League of Legends. Riot's first tabletop game under Riot Tabletop was Tellstones: King's Gambit, a bluffing game for two or four players, released in 2020.

=== Card game ===
In August 2025, Riot Games released Riftbound, a multiplayer trading card game set within the world of Runeterra.
