= Tellstones: King's Gambit =

2020 tabletop game

King's Gambit
- Designers: Riot Games
- Publication: September 16, 2020; 5 years ago
- Players: 2 or 4
- Playing time: 10 minutes
- Skills: Memorization

Tellstones: King's Gambit is a 2020 tabletop game created by Riot Games under their Riot Tabletop division. Two or four players take turns placing, swapping, and guessing tokens; the goal of the game is to either guess three tokens correctly or "boast" successfully by correctly guessing all hidden tokens. Developed as part of Riot's expansion into games outside League of Legends, the game is the company's second tabletop product following their 2016 release Mechs vs. Minions. Tellstones was released in September 2020; reviewers praised the game for its presentation and build quality, but criticized its gameplay as short and uninteresting.

== Overview ==
=== Setting ===
Tellstones is set in Runeterra, the fictional universe of the video game League of Legends, and is "based on a traditional game played in the fictional region of Demacia".

=== Gameplay ===
Tellstones is a two- or four-player memory-based game that takes around 10 minutes to play. In the two-player version, the players place down a piece of felt—the "line"—between them on a table. The players take turns instructing each other to place a token (which has a symbol on one side) on the line, flip a token upside down (to hide the token's symbol), or swap the positions of two tokens. A player can challenge their opponent to guess the symbol on an upside-down token in order to score a point; the first player to three points wins the game. They can also use their turn to look at an upside-down token; if their opponent scored a point in the previous turn, they may look at three tokens. Tellstones also has a "boast" mechanic, where a player can claim that they know the symbols of all upside-down tokens on the line. If the player successfully guesses all the tokens, they win the game. If the player cannot name all the tokens, they lose instead. The opponent can challenge the boast with a boast of their own; the first player can avoid the counter-boast by conceding a point.

In the four-player version, players are divided into two teams: two players, one from each team, sit on each side of the line. Players take turns in a counter-clockwise order, and during their turn instruct their opponent to the left. When a team boasts, its members take turns guessing the upside-down tokens.

== Development ==
To promote the fictional universe of their video game League of Legends, the video game company Riot Games released numerous League of Legends-related projects and games throughout 2019 and 2020. Included within this goal was the company's expansion into tabletop game development. Following Riot's success with their first tabletop game in 2016, Mechs vs. Minions, the company announced the creation of a new internal studio in January 2020, Riot Tabletop, that would develop further tabletop games. Chris Cantrell, the creative director for the studio, said he came up with the core gameplay idea of Tellstones at Gen Con 2017. Cantrell "decided to differentiate the game" by providing "heirloom quality" game pieces. The studio tried to tie the game into League of Legends by working around what Demacian symbols might look like and represent.

Tellstones was released on September 16, 2020; its release was slightly delayed due to the COVID-19 pandemic.

== Reception ==
Reviewers praised the game's presentation and build quality, but criticized the game as short and uninteresting. Charlie Hall of Polygon praised the presentation and game pieces as "exceptional", and described the game as "solid" but "one-note and awfully short". Kotaku's Luke Plunkett complimented the build quality as "premium" but expressed confusion with the game, opining that it "just feels fast and disposable, like a playground game or a round of poker". The game was criticized as "a chore to play" by Alex Meehan of Dicebreaker, who argued that Tellstones's gameplay was uninteresting because of the lack of any mechanics beyond its memory-based components. Plunkett asserted that the game had little connections to the League of Legends narrative universe, while Hall considered the game "barebones" compared to its predecessor Mechs vs. Minions.

== See also ==
- Mechs vs. Minions
