= Untitled Runeterra MMO =

Upcoming Riot Games MMORPG

- "Map of Runeterra" by Riot Games
- Developer: Riot Games
- Publisher: Riot Games
- Producers: Marc Merrill, Fabrice Condominas, Sarah Tudor, Raymond Bartos
- Series: League of Legends
- Engine: Unreal Engine
- Platform: Windows
- Release: Expected 2028 – 2029
- Genre: Massively multiplayer online role-playing game
- Mode: Multiplayer

The Untitled Runeterra MMO (often referred to as "the Riot MMO" or "the League of Legends MMO") is an upcoming MMORPG developed by Riot Games and set in Runeterra, the fictional world of League of Legends. The game will be part of Riot's new unified Runeterra canon, alongside Arcane, Legends of Runeterra, and all other Runeterra content released after October 13, 2023. Riot Games announced the project on December 17, 2020.

Little is known about the game's features, although it will reportedly have a "persistent sandbox world", "innovative gameplay concepts" and "action RPG elements". The game is confirmed to feature third person, as well as a focus on action combat as opposed to tab targeting. Greg Street, previously the executive producer for the game, also stated that a pay-to-play or subscription model would be unlikely, citing Riot's typical business model of creating free-to-play games supported by cosmetic microtransactions.

In early 2024, Riot Games co-founder and chief product officer Marc Merrill (known as "Tryndamere") announced that the project's direction had been partially reset after the team concluded that an earlier version was too similar to existing MMORPGs. Merrill also stated that Riot intended to limit public communication during development moving forward.

As of 2026, the game is expected to be released before 2030, according to co-founder Marc Merrill.

== Development ==
=== Early development ===
Early research and development on a League of Legends MMO began as early as 2016. On December 17, 2020, Greg Street (previously a Rioter for 7 years and a lead systems designer on World of Warcraft), announced that Riot was making an MMO set in the League of Legends universe. This was followed by several posts on social media by other Riot employees announcing that they were searching for "MMO veterans" to join the team. In the months following the announcement, Riot provided limited public updates regarding the project.

Early statements from Riot indicated that the game would have a "very large" open world and an emphasis on "respecting the player's time", including a lower expected time commitment from players and less "FOMO" than other MMO titles.

=== Major reset ===
In March 2023, Greg Street announced his departure from Riot, citing both personal and professional reasons, and stated that the project would continue under new leadership. Vijay Thakkar replaced Greg Street as the executive producer on the MMO until 2024. A decision to reset the MMO was made around the time of Street’s departure, and Thakkar was placed in charge of preparing the technical foundations for future development due to his previous experience serving as the game's technical director. Thakkar later left the company in December 2024.

In March 2024, Riot confirmed that development of the MMO had undergone a significant reset “some time ago”. According to Marc Merrill, the decision was made because the existing version of the game was too similar to other MMORPGs on the market. The company stated that it did not want to produce a game that mostly copied other MMOs with a Runeterra "coat of paint", and instead chose to partially restart development to pursue a more distinct direction. Merrill stated that Riot aims to create something that is "a significant evolution of the genre".

This announcement was accompanied by news that Fabrice Condominas (known as "Faburisu") would act as the new executive producer on the MMO. Following the reset, Merrill stated that the project would "go dark", entering a period of limited public communication for several years, and told fans that "no news is good news" as it meant the development team were hard at work.

=== After the major reset ===
On January 15, 2026, Raymond Bartos (known as "GoodGuyRay"), a former lead producer on World of Warcraft, announced that he was joining the Runeterra MMO team as a senior game producer.

In April 2026, Orlando Salvatore, a former software engineer on World of Warcraft, announced that he was now acting as Senior Engineer Manager for the project.

On April 15, 2026, Riot confirmed that it had previously explored the possibility of investing in or acquiring Intrepid Studios, the developer of Ashes of Creation (another MMO that was in development at the time), but ultimately chose not to proceed with a deal.

On June 1st, 2026, Brian Holinka, previously the lead combat designer on World of Warcraft responsible for class design and PvP content, announced that he was joining the Runeterra MMO team as a principal game designer.

In August 2026, Riot's decision to wind down development of 2XKO prompted questions about the company's commitment to long-term game development. PC Gamer subsequently expressed concern that the decision could have implications for the MMO, citing the lengthy development cycles and costs associated with the genre. IGN later stated that sentiment among fans, particular from within the fighting game community, had a "healthy dose of skepticism" regarding Riot's commitment to the MMO.

In September 2026 at PAX West, Marc Merrill stated that internally the MMO was referred to as "The Grail", describing the project as a difficult but worthwhile undertaking. Merrill said that Riot was aware of players' expectations for the game and that the challenge was in executing those ambitions successfully. He explained the name by saying:

"We jokingly call it 'The Grail' internally because we're like, 'Fuck, many a brave knight will die on the grail quest, but fuck it, it's the grail, so let's go.'"

— Marc Merrill, Speaking at PAX West

Merrill also said that the project's future was "incredibly bright" and that it remained a major long-term project for the company.

As of September 2026, the game is in active development, with Fabrice Condominas serving as the executive producer under supervision by Marc Merrill, who is "heavily involved in the new direction", and said that Riot is "more committed than ever" to developing its MMO. The project remains without an official title or release date. No gameplay footage, screenshots, trailers, or MMO-exclusive artwork have been officially released or leaked to the public as of September 2026.

== Reception and anticipation ==
Despite the lack of publicly released gameplay material, the project has attracted significant attention due to the popularity of the League of Legends IP and Riot's involvement. It is frequently cited among the most anticipated upcoming MMORPGs, in particular after several MMOs failed to attract a sustainable audience in 2025 and 2026.

== See also ==
- List of videogames in development
- Category:Upcoming video games
- List of League of Legends media
- List of MMORPGs
