= Riot Forge =

Video game publisher

- Type: Division
- Industry: Video games
- Founded: December 2019; 6 years ago
- Defunct: January 2024; 2 years ago
- Headquarters: Los Angeles, California, U.S.
- Products: A League of Legends Story series
- Parent: Riot Games
- Website: riotforgegames.com

Riot Forge was an American video game publishing label created by Riot Games, developers of the MOBA video game League of Legends. Its purpose was to fund various critically-acclaimed indie game studios to create spin-off games in the fictional universe of Runeterra, generally centered around one or more of the series' playable characters, or Champions. The label was initially created in 2019, and a number of games were published under it with generally positive critical reception.

Riot Forge was shut down five years later in January 2024, during the 2023–2024 video game industry layoffs prompted by a post-COVID-19 pandemic drop in video game demand. The shutdown of Riot Forge was bemoaned by critics, who praised the publishing label for supporting indie developers and allowing non-competitive players to become immersed in the series' lore. Critics of the shutdown attributed the disappointing sales of Riot Forge's games to the company's ineffective marketing strategy and limited consumer outreach, arguing that broader video gaming community was unaware the spin-off titles had been released.

== History ==
The main League of Legends game was not seen as an effective vehicle for storytelling, leaving the lore of the series to be told in blurbs on the studio's website. This led to the creation of Riot Forge as one attempt to expand the series' mythos. The game making process was hands-off, and allowed studios to make a genre of game they would prefer, albeit one that would likely see commercial success. One main restriction was that the games had to be set in the standard Runeterra universe and not in any alternate ones depicted by the main game's themed player skins, such as K/DA or Star Guardians. Riot Games did not expect the games to profit greatly and were largely interested in the games breaking even, while assisting indie developers to remain afloat.

After the announcement of the label in 2019, Riot Forge proceeded to publish indie games in numerous different genres. The label's debut games were Hextech Mayhem, a rhythm game, and Ruined King, a turn-based role-playing game, both released in 2021. Convergence, a Metroidvania game, tied into the Netflix show Arcane, while The Mageseeker was a top-down action role-playing game, which was released alongside a 4-issue prologue comic. The label's final two games were Song of Nunu, a 3D platformer that was widely praised by critics, and Bandle Tale, a non-violent life sim. The label's games were generally a critical success, with positive scores on both Steam and Metacritic.

In a 2023 interview, creative director Rowan Parker stated that he would also have been interested in publishing a League of Legends-based dating sim, similar to the 2020 tie-in visual novel Spirit Bonds, citing widespread player interest in "shipping", or fan-made romances between characters, but were not accepting new games at the moment.

=== Closure ===
Riot Forge was shut down in January 2024, as part of the 2023–2024 video game industry layoffs. Within Riot Games, 530 employees were laid off, representing 11% of its total workforce. Riot CEO Dylan Jadeja cited increasing development costs becoming unsustainable for the company. The development team of Legends of Runeterra was also pared down to solely focus on development of the main game.

== Reception ==
Cass Marshall of Polygon wrote that the closure of the publisher would significantly harm fans of the game by cutting off the entry point for new players. Calling the main game a "nightmare carnival of toxicity", she stated that only the game's expanded universe, such as the show Arcane, was something she could confidently share with friends and loved ones. Describing the 2024 Bandle Tale as "possibly the strongest example of how these games make the League IP a less threatening and alarming place", she praised its "low-pressure exploration", noting that it was the "opposite of a competitive ranked game". She also criticized the removal of developers and writers who contributed to expanding on the champions, saying the lack of new lore was bad for both players and the series, and would make the fictional universe "much smaller".

Ali Jones of GamesRadar+ also sharply criticized the decision to close Riot Forge, describing the shutdown as a "huge wasted opportunity". Saying that Riot Games had failed to market the games properly, he commented that it "often felt as though Riot's own community had little knowledge of Forge's existence", saying that the products struggled to reach the people they were "laser-targeted" towards. While saying that the general populace may not have been interested in single-player League of Legends games, he also called Riot's marketing "risk-averse", noting social media comments that some players had no idea the games existed. He also mentioned that Riot sent review copies to reviewers late, usually a sign of poor quality, despite the high quality of the games themselves. He summed it up as "a case of wasted potential" that only did well "in apparent spite of Riot's marketing efforts", stating his belief that the company "could have done a whole lot more".

== Games published ==
| Year | Title | Developer | Platform(s) | Ref. |
|---|---|---|---|---|
| 2021 | Ruined King: A League of Legends Story | Airship Syndicate | Nintendo Switch, PlayStation 4, Windows, Xbox One | |
| 2021 | Hextech Mayhem: A League of Legends Story | Choice Provisions | Nintendo Switch, Windows | |
| 2023 | Convergence: A League of Legends Story | Double Stallion | Windows, Nintendo Switch, PlayStation 4, PlayStation 5, Xbox One, Xbox Series X/S | |
| 2023 | Song of Nunu: A League of Legends Story | Tequila Works | Nintendo Switch, Windows, PlayStation 4, PlayStation 5, Xbox One, Xbox Series X/S | |
| 2023 | The Mageseeker: A League of Legends Story | Digital Sun | Nintendo Switch, PlayStation 4, PlayStation 5, Windows, Xbox One, Xbox Series X/S | |
| 2024 | Bandle Tale: A League of Legends Story | Lazy Bear Games | Nintendo Switch, Windows | |
