= Bandle Tale =

Bandle Tale: A League of Legends Story
- Developer: Lazy Bear Games
- Publisher: Riot Forge
- Series: League of Legends
- Engine: Unity
- Platforms: Windows, Nintendo Switch
- Release: February 21, 2024
- Genres: Role-playing, farm life sim
- Mode: Single-player

Bandle Tale: A League of Legends Story is a role-playing video game and farm life sim developed by Lithuania-based studio Lazy Bear Games and published by Riot Forge. It was released on February 21, 2024, for Windows and Nintendo Switch. The game, a spin-off of League of Legends, is set in Bandle City, the home of the fictional fairy-like Yordle race, in the fictional universe of Runeterra. The player character is a custom-created Yordle who befriends characters from League of Legends such as Teemo as they seek to fix a malfunction causing the portals connecting each sky island of Bandle City to break. As the player progresses through the game, new parts of the city are unlocked. The game received positive reviews from critics, who praised its graphics and atmosphere, but criticized the gameplay as overly repetitive.

== Reception ==
Both the Nintendo Switch and PC versions of the game received "generally favorable" reviews from critics, according to the review aggregation website Metacritic. Fellow review aggregator OpenCritic assessed that the game received fair approval, being recommended by 58% of critics. Kaan Serin of Rock Paper Shotgun called the game's pixel art "gorgeous", also praising the characters as "cute enough to trigger primal cheek-squishing instincts", but also stated that it "unfortunately ties itself in knots with overly grindy crafting". Cass Marshall of Polygon praised the game for its "chill and cozy atmosphere", saying it contrasted with League of Legends' "high-stress experience". Ali Jones of GamesRadar+ said that one of the best parts of the game was throwing parties for fellow Yordles, calling it "the most unlikely of League of Legends spinoffs". Neal Chandran of RPGFan had mixed opinions on the game, calling the graphics its "crowning feature", but saying it had too few musical tracks. He summed the game up as an "overlong rough draft", saying that parts were "artificially padded".
