= Hextech Mayhem =

Hextech Mayhem: A League of Legends Story
- Developer: Choice Provisions
- Publishers: Riot Forge; Netflix Games (mobile)
- Composer: Stemage
- Series: League of Legends
- Engine: Unity
- Platforms: Microsoft Windows; Nintendo Switch; iOS; Android
- Release: 16 November 2021; 1 February 2022 (Mobile)
- Genre: Rhythm game
- Mode: Single-player

Hextech Mayhem: A League of Legends Story is a rhythm video game developed by Choice Provisions and published by Riot Forge, a publishing division of Riot Games, the developers of League of Legends. Hextech Mayhem was released on 16 November 2021 alongside Ruined King: A League of Legends Story. Both games use characters from League of Legends in their story and gameplay.

== Reception ==
Reception

Aggregate scores
Aggregator	Score
Metacritic	(PC) 72/100 (NS) 67/100
OpenCritic	71/100; 31% Critics Recommend

Review scores
Publication	Score
Destructoid	8/10
Jeuxvideo.com	14/20
Nintendo World Report	5/10

Hextech Mayhem received "mixed or average" reviews according to review aggregator Metacritic.

Chris Carter of Destructoid gave the game an eight out of ten, praising the game's soundtrack for being "...some of Choice Provisions' best work" while appreciating the various mascot platforming homages strewn throughout the game.

Nintendo World Report praised the game for its sense of flow and criticized the numerous technical issues present in the Switch port of the game, calling its framerate drops "debilitating" for a rhythm game while calling the freestyle mayhem "frustrating and limiting".
