= Greg Street =

American video game designer

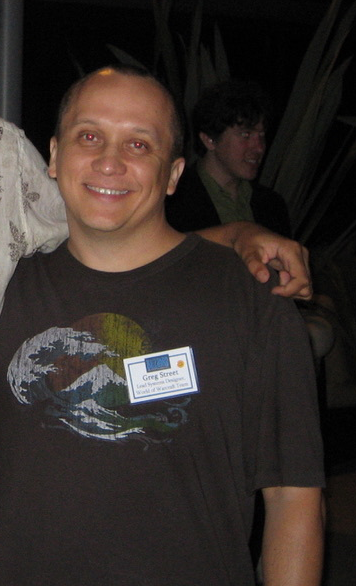
- Street from 2009 BlizzCon
- Occupation: Video Game Developer
- Employer: Fantastic Pixel Castle
- Title: Studio Head & Game Director
- Website: askghostcrawler.tumblr.com

Greg Street is an American video game designer and former Head of Creative Development for Riot Games.

Street was previously employed by Blizzard Entertainment as Lead Systems Designer on the award-winning MMORPG World of Warcraft, and is also known by his screen name "Ghostcrawler" on the World of Warcraft forums and his own Twitter account. Prior to being employed by Blizzard, Street worked as a marine biologist, eventually moving into the game design field. He also worked with Ensemble Studios on the Age of Empires series of real-time strategy games, during which period he was also known by the screen name "Deathshrimp".

In November 2013 he announced on his personal Facebook that he was leaving Blizzard Entertainment to pursue a "great opportunity for something new and exciting." In January 2014, it was announced that Greg Street had become the Lead Game Designer for Riot Games and in August 2018, Street shared the news that he would become Head of Creative Development at Riot, through a tweet in which he stated he would not be working directly on League of Legends anymore.

On 17 December 2020, Street announced that he had been working as executive producer on a previously unannounced MMO set in the League of Legends universe, simultaneously announcing the game's development. He remained with the project until he left Riot Games in March 2023.

On 28 July 2021, Street's name came up in a photo-op in the infamous Cosby Room with Alex Afrasiabi, who was named in a California State lawsuit against Activision-Blizzard for mistreating women at the company.

== Education and early career ==
Street graduated from McDaniel College in 1991 with a Bachelor of Arts degrees in biology and philosophy, later earning a PhD in marine science. Between 1996 and 1998, Street worked as a research assistant professor at the University of South Carolina. Street has said his work was only enjoyable to him "for the first several years or so...As I moved up the ranks, however, I was spending more and more of my time writing grant proposals, filling out paperwork and playing departmental politics." Street found that his profession involved "a lot of doing the same thing over and over again."

== Game design career ==
Ensemble Studios, the team behind the real-time strategy series Age of Empires, employed Street as a designer in 1998. With no education or experience in the game industry, Street suspects he was accepted due to his "writing and teaching experience, historical breadth, personal hygiene, gudd speling [sic], creativity, [and] my talent at capturing live alligators", as well as the user-created scenario for Age of Empires he submitted with his application, which later appeared in Age of Empires: The Rise of Rome. Street helped develop every Age of Empires game from Rise of Rome on, until his departure from the company. At first he designed in-game scenarios and maps, and later graduated to being the team's lead designer.

Street was hired by Blizzard Entertainment in February 2008, and was the lead systems designer on the MMORPG World of Warcraft until November 2013. He described his role at Blizzard as, "Systems design specifically is everything that is not level, story, quest, PvP or encounter design. My team handles everything from mechanics to items to trade skills to achievements to UI design." On the World of Warcraft message boards, he is known by his user name "Ghostcrawler". Street worked in a similar capacity with Blizzard as he did with Ensemble as a designer. "Game designers are not artists or programmers, but we use the tools developed by the programmers and the assets created by the artists to get content into the game. Programmers make the game run, artists make it beautiful, but it is the designer's job to make it fun." Street became well-known in the World of Warcraft community during the public beta test for World of Warcraft: Wrath of the Lich King, during which he was frequently communicating with beta testers on the message boards. He was often on the message boards announcing changes to the game or discussing them with players. Because "game balance is one of the most controversial aspects of any multiplayer game... I benefit from being able to engage the community directly." Apart from discussions on the Blizzard forums, Street also interacted with the World of Warcraft community regularly via his Twitter account.

He left Riot in March 2023, claiming a combination of both personal and professional aspects led him to his decision.
