= Teamfight Tactics =

Auto battler video game developed by Riot Games

- Developer: Riot Games
- Publisher: Riot Games
- Series: League of Legends
- Engine: Hextech Engine (2019–2026); Unreal Engine (2026–present)
- Platforms: Windows; macOS; Android; iOS
- Release: Windows, macOS; June 26, 2019; Android, iOS; March 19, 2020
- Genre: Auto battler
- Mode: Multiplayer

Teamfight Tactics (TFT) is an auto battler game developed and published by Riot Games. The game is a spinoff of League of Legends and is based on Dota Auto Chess, a mod for Dota 2, which in turn was inspired by Mahjong. Players face online against seven other opponents in a team building competition to be the last one standing.

The game released as a League of Legends game mode for Windows and macOS in June 2019 and as a standalone game for Android and iOS in March 2020, featuring cross-platform play between them.

== Gameplay ==
The Teamfight Tactics board. Units can be deployed on a hexagon board and paired against other players.

The game centers around eight players who construct teams to fight one another and be the last player standing. The battlefield consists of hexagons, where players can strategically place units on the hexagons on their side of the game board between rounds. Each round, a player is randomly matched against another player or against computer-controlled enemies that drop loot. The round initiates a battle with the two teams which lasts until units of one team are all defeated or a time limit is reached. Losing the round will result in the player losing health as a penalty based on the number of enemies remaining and the number of rounds completed.

The game consists of several stages, with each stage consisting of seven rounds. After round three of each stage, players will participate in a "Carousel" event. A Carousel event allows players access to a free, shared rotation of units with random equipped items to select from. Players are allowed to select one unit from the rotation with the pick order determined by the health remaining of each player sorted from lowest to highest and assigned to two players at a time. If there are players with the same health, the game will randomly choose the order. On the last round of each stage, players will face computer-controlled enemies. The exception to the stage rules is the first stage, which consists of three rounds of computer-controlled enemies.

Teamfight Tactics periodically updates its unit roster. Every three months there is a partial rotation, referred by Riot Games developers as a mid-set update, rotating out traits and units which are problematic. As Teamfight Tactics is a game mode of League of Legends, its patch numbering follows the same as its parent game rather than being labelled differently.

=== Units ===
Champions from League of Legends are used in Teamfight Tactics and can be obtained at various costs.

Units in Teamfight Tactics are directly ripped from the champions of League of Legends in which they inherit skins, abilities, and role. Each unit can share "traits" with other units that activate synergies to benefit combat against other players (i.e. granting additional combat power, granting gold). Teamfight Tactics regularly updates its unit pools in the form of content updates called "sets".

Unit rarity is separated into category's based on cost, typically ranging from 1 to 5 gold per unit and higher rarities possessing more powerful abilities. Each unit starts as a "1 star" and is able to be upgraded to "2 star" if three copies of the same unit are found in the shop. A unit can be further upgraded to "3 star" by collecting three "2 star" copies (9 units in total). Upgrading a unit upgrades their stats and abilities.

With some exceptions, units have a health bar and a mana bar. When a unit's health reaches zero, they are effectively removed from the round. When a unit's mana bar is full, they cast a unique ability. Some units may start the round with some percentage of their mana bar full, but units generally start the round with no mana unless equipped with special items.

Items play a pivotal role in team fight tactics by providing bonuses to the holder (such as damage, health and armour) as well as granting them, or other units around them, special effects. Items are separated into three main categories: components, completed items and miscellaneous items. Components offer comparatively lesser buffs to the holding unit and typically do not offer any special effects, however when combined with another component on the same unit, will transform into a completed item. Completed items typically offer better stats and unique effects to strengthen the players units. Items can primarily be gained through carousel rounds, computer controlled enemy loot combat rounds or through augments. Each unit has three equip-able inventory slots that can be used to hold any combination of completed items, components and special items such as emblems, which grant units additional traits.

=== Gold ===
Players accumulate gold during rounds and can save it to build interest Players can also gain additional income per round with "streak bonuses" by either winning multiple rounds in a row or losing multiple rounds in a row. With gold, players can either reroll the five units automatically offered to them in their shop at the start of each round, purchase units from their shop or purchase experience points to increase their level. The higher a player's level, the more units they can place on the board. Higher player levels also increase the average rarity of units in the shop.

=== Augments ===
Augments were introduced to the game with the release of Set 6: Gizmos & Gadgets and has been a mainstay mechanic for current sets. These are in game effects that are selected by the player on certain rounds and provides various buffs (in-combat stat bonuses), resources (gold, items and units) or other modifications (modifying interest rate, increased unit limit, increased Tactician health). Augments range in rarity from silver, gold and prismatic, with each tier awarding and unlocking better potential benefits. For each augment round, players are given a choice of three augments to pick from.

== Development and release ==
=== Pre-Release ===
An early prototype of Teamfight Tactics using a square grid

Teamfight Tactics origins were directly inspired by the rising popularity of Dota Auto Chess and started as a project with a 12 developer team. The goal of the developers was to directly improve Dota Auto Chess by improving the design, utilizing their collective experience, and make it more engaging. The timeline was to complete the project in 18 weeks: 8 weeks for prototyping and 10 weeks for release.

=== Release ===
The game was released within the League of Legends client for Windows and macOS on June 26, 2019, and as a standalone app for Android and iOS on March 19, 2020. By September 2019, the game had over 33 million monthly players with 1.72 billion hours of accumulated game time.

In December 2024, Riot Games launched Golden Spatula, a version of Teamfight Tactics for Android and iOS for Thailand, Malaysia, and Singapore. This version offers collaborations and exclusive cosmetics.

In August 2026, with the release of Set 18: Enchanted Wilds, Teamfight Tactics switched from the shared League of Legends Hextech engine to Unreal Engine.

=== Cosmetics ===
Similar to other free-to-play games from Riot, Teamfight Tactics monetization base around cosmetic consumptions and season passes. It has its own store separate from League of Legends. The player's controllable avatar, called a Tactician (previously "Little Legend"), can be customized by buying avatar cosmetics from the store. Those can be upgraded by buying from loot boxes called "Little Legend eggs" or through star shards that can either be bought in the store or earned from the season pass that lasts for the duration of the set. Now, in addition to "Little Legend eggs", the treasure tokens system was introduced as a method to obtain little legends. Typically, the treasure tokens are mainly used to roll for a rare, highlighted tactician. Since the release of the Chibi Champions, Riot refers to these avatars as Tacticians, though the term Little Legend is still commonly used. Note, however, Tactician had been a term to refer to players before that.

Other than the controllable avatar, Teamfight Tactics also has skins for the player board where the combat between players is played. The boards can be bought directly or through bundles in the store. Boards also come with different prizes, while the cheap ones only change the model of the board, expensive ones are interactive and react to player achievement. Beside that, there is Boom, cosmetic that modify the damage particles of the Tactician. All Booms released so far are rewards of Battle Pass.

In November 2024 to promote the release of the newest season of Arcane a new type of tactician was introduced referred to as Unbound. Unbound Champion tacticians are the purest embodiment of that champion at the height of their power. Unlike Chibi Champions or Little Legends, Unbound Champions feature designs that are grounded in the ultimate version of a champion's power fantasy, personality and backstory.

Riot expanded the cosmetic lineup in April 2025 with the release of Portals together with Cyber City. Portals are a cosmetic feature that changes the visual effects shown when a Tactician travels through the map. They can be bought in the mythic store or earned from the Battle Pass. Portals are offered in two tiers: Standard Portals priced at 1 Mythic Medallion and Legendary Portals priced at 3 Mythic Medallions.

=== Game modes ===
Besides Normal and Ranked game modes, Riot offers different game modes with different play styles.

==== Hyper Roll ====
Hyper Roll is a faster-paced game mode that was launched in April 2021, streamlining mechanics to decrease game time. Hyper Roll gameplay differences include the following: Little Legends only carry 20 health and take 2 damage per fight lost for the first 4 stages, 4 damage from 5 to 7, and 8 damage from anything beyond, 75% increased movement speed, and the carousel is not part of the game.

In May 2025, Hyper Roll was announced to be retired and no longer playable. According the incumbent TFT Game Director Peter Whalen, "Hyper Roll was released...with the goal of delivering a more straightforward, shorter TFT experience that could help new players learn the game without needing to master econ. What happened on release was pretty different-Hyper Roll was certainly faster, but the lack of downtime meant you still needed a ton of set familiarity and a deep understanding of tempo to stay alive...We knew Hyper Roll missed our intended goals. Players still lacked an effective tool for learning TFT."

==== Double Up ====
In early 2022, Riot Games released Double Up as a new game mode. a Double-Up game consists of four teams of two players, with each pair sharing a health bar. Each player fights a singular player of a different team at a time, and every fight each player loses subtracts from the shared health bar. There are unique game mechanics such as being able to send champions, items, or other resources to your teammate, as well as joining your teammate's battle.

==== Other ====
Riot Games have also released several temporary game modes. Fortune's Favor was the first to be released, spanning from Jan to Feb 2023. This featured opening carousels with 4 or 5 cost units, and loot orbs dropped throughout the game. Soul Brawl was the next to be released, available to play from July 19 to August 15, 2023. This featured a long Training Phase in which you assemble and power up your team, followed by a tournament bracket to decide the top spots.

In January 2025, Teamfight Tactics (TFT) added Set Revivals as a separate, reoccurring game mode with the reintroduction of the mid-set expansion "Festival of Beasts" from Set 4.5. Set Revivals are reintroductions of previous Sets by aiming to blend nostalgia with modern gameplay enhancements. These modes usually inject high-income econ traits, massive loot drops, or custom legacy traits from past sets into the game to create wild, overpowered end-game boards.

=== Sets ===
Teamfight Tactics is being supported by Riot Games post-launch, with regular balance updates to keep the game fair and entertaining, as well as Little Legend egg drops. The game also updates the game in a big way with "sets". Sets give players more incentive to play the game, changing synergies and introducing new ones, rotating various League of Legends champions into the roster, as well as dropping new season passes. News regarding the current set can be found at the Teamfight Tactics news website.

Sets
No.	Name	Release date	Ref.
19	Prismatic Tour	December 2, 2026	
18	Enchanted Wilds	August 26, 2026	
17	Space Gods	April 15, 2026	
16	Lore & Legends	December 3, 2025	
15	K.O. Coliseum	July 30, 2025	
14	Cyber City	April 2, 2025	
13	Into the Arcane	November 20, 2024	
12	Magic N' Mayhem	July 31, 2024	
11	Inkborn Fables	March 20, 2024	
10	Remix Rumble	November 21, 2023	
9.5	Runeterra Reforged: Horizon Bound	September 13, 2023	
9	Runeterra Reforged	June 14, 2023	
8.5	Monsters Attack: Glitched Out!	March 22, 2023	
8	Monsters Attack!	December 7, 2022	
7.5	Dragonlands: Uncharted Realms	September 8, 2022	
7	Dragonlands	June 8, 2022	
6.5	Gizmos & Gadgets: Neon Lights	February 16, 2022	
6	Gizmos & Gadgets	November 3, 2021	
5.5	Reckoning: Dawn of Heroes	July 21, 2021	
5	Reckoning	April 28, 2021	
4.5	Fates: Festival of Beasts	January 21, 2021	
4	Fates	September 16, 2020	
3.5	Galaxies: Return to the Stars	June 10, 2020	
3	Galaxies	March 18, 2020	
2	Rise of the Elements	November 19, 2019	
1	Beta Set	June 29, 2019	

== Esports ==
=== TFT Championships ===
Season	Title	No.	Date	Champion	Runner-up
17	Space Gods Tactician's Crown	40	2026-07-12	(China) Huanmie	(France) Jedusor
16	Lore & Legends Tactician's Crown	40	2026-03-29	(United States) Darth Nub	(China) saya
15	K.O. Coliseum Tactician's Crown	40	2025-11-16	(Taiwan) WithoutYou	(China) weimuluoqiu
14	Cyber City Tactician's Crown	40	2025-07-13	(Japan) summertimer	(Hong Kong) AQ1H
13	Into the Arcane Tactician's Crown	40	2025-03-16	(United States) Dishsoap	(France) Jedusor
12	Magic n' Mayhem Tactician's Crown	40	2024-11-10	(Japan) Title	(China) RiYue
11	Inkborn Fables Tactician's Crown	32	2024-07-14	(United States) Dishsoap	(France) Double61
10	Remix Rumble Championship	32	2024-03-03	(United States) Milala	(China) RiYue
9	Runeterra Reforged Championship	32	2023-11-05	(Japan) Title	(Germany) Wet Jungler
8	Monsters Attack! Championship	32	2023-05-28	(United States) Rereplay	(China) Flancy
7	Dragonlands Championship	32	2022-11-20	(China) Xunge	(Japan) Title
6	Gizmos & Gadgets Championship	32	2022-05-01	(China) LiLuo	(China) LiuLi
5	Reckoning Championship	20	2021-10-04	(China) Huanmie	(China) qituX
4	Fates Championship	24	2021-04-09	(South Korea) 8ljaywalking	(France) ZyK0o
3	Galaxies Championship	16	2020-09-04	(France) Double61	(Denmark) Lev D Trotskij

=== TFT Open Series ===
- TFT Vegas Open (2023)
- TFT Macao Open (2024)
- TFT Paris Open (2025)

=== Others ===
- TFT Pro Circuit (TPC)
- TFT Open Championship (TOC)
- JCC Open Championship (JOC)
- Esports World Cup (EWC)
