= Mechs vs. Minions =

2016 board game

- Designers: Chris Cantrell, Rick Ernst, Stone Librande, Prashant Saraswat, Nathan Tiras
- Publishers: Riot Games
- Players: 2 to 4
- Playing time: 60 to 120 minutes
- Chance: Medium
- Skills: Resource management, Planning

Mechs vs. Minions is a 2016 cooperative board game published by Riot Games set in the League of Legends universe.

== Gameplay ==
=== Components ===
Mechs vs. Minions is a cooperative game, where players support each other by planning and sharing commands to control mechs to achieve a goal. Each player has a Command Line, consists of 6 slots. Players play Command Cards into these slots, and then execute the commands in order from left to right.

The commands stay mostly unchanged, and are changed bit by bit each turn. It is important for players to plan ahead, use the right commands, as the danger and tension ramps up.

Game Terms:

- Command Line: A storage for a Mech command cards.
- Command Cards: A command player can put on their Command Line.
- Damage Cards: Penalty cards for taking damage in the game. Some gives immediately effects, while others take up a Command Line slot and have ongoing effects, making the Mech harder to control.
- Crystal Shards, Bombs, Lava Wall Cardboard: Several Objectives of the Games.
- Map Tiles: Cardboard tiles that make the map of the game.
- Mechs: Player units.
- Minions: The main enemies of the game.

=== During Play ===
Game are split into three phases:

- Player Phase: This phase is when the player plan and execute the command lines for the robots to work.
- Minion Phase: The main and common enemies of the players are the Minions. They move, spawn and attack during this phase.
- Danger Phase: A special phase during which the campaign mechanic progress, for example, lava wall or Boss.

=== Campaign ===
Players play Mechs vs. Minions in a series of campaigns. In some campaigns, players have to protect a bomb from minions. In others, it is to escape a lava wall, or defeat the boss.

== Reception ==
Mech vs. Minions was overall received positively. The game is praised for the creative combination of programming gameplay and cooperative play. It is also praised for the high product value compare to its price. However, the game is criticized for its low replayability, when players stop after finishing all campaigns. Riot has since launched a page for players to create and share their own Mech vs Minions campaigns.

=== Awards ===
Year	Award	Category	Result	Ref.
2018	Juego del Año	Finalists	Nominated	
2017	SXSW Tabletop	Game of the Year	Nominated	
2016	Golden Geek	Most Innovative Board Game	Nominated	
2016	Golden Geek	Board Game of the Year	Nominated	
2016	Golden Geek	Best Thematic Board Game	Nominated	
2016	Golden Geek	Best Strategy Board Game	Nominated	
2016	Golden Geek	Best Board Game Artwork & Presentation	Nominated	
2016	Golden Geek	Best Cooperative Game	Won	
2016	Board Game Quest Awards	Game of the Year	Nominated	
2016	Board Game Quest Awards	Best Production Values	Won	
2016	Board Game Quest Awards	Best Coop Game	Won	
