= Riftbound =

Trading card game

- Riftbound cardback
- Publishers: UVS Games (WW); Shining Soul (China)
- Release date: 31 October 2025
- Players: 2+

Related games
- League of Legends
- Website: playriftbound.com/en-us/

Riftbound: League of Legends Trading Card Game, also known as Riftbound, is a trading card game developed by Riot Games, set in the League of Legends universe. The worldwide version is being published by UVS Games, while the Chinese release is handled by Shining Soul.

== Development and release ==
Development of Riftbound began in 2023, led by game director Dave Guskin, who previously served as director for Riot Games' digital trading card game (TCG) Legends of Runeterra, and executive producer Chengran Chai. In September 2024, a trailer for Rune Battlegrounds, an upcoming TCG based on the League of Legends intellectual property, was leaked on Twitter. The game was scheduled for release in early 2025 exclusively in China, with no plans for a global release. In December 2024, Riot Games officially announced the TCG under the working title Project K, confirming its release for early 2025 in China. A global release was also confirmed; however, no release date was provided, as Riot had yet to secure a publishing partner for other regions. In February 2025, UVS Games was announced as official publishing and distribution partner for English-speaking countries, with additional global regions planned for 2026. In the following month, Riot announced the title of the game as Riftbound: League of Legends Trading Card Game, with a planned launch in China in Summer 2025. Shining Soul was confirmed as the publisher and distributor in the region.

The first set, titled Origins, was released in China in August 2025, followed by an English-language release on October 31, 2025. The launch encountered three problems. First, supply was insufficient to meet the high demand. Second, some cards had burred or rough edges. Third, a certain percentage of booster packs contained fewer rare cards than intended due to a collation error. The collation problem also affected the second set and Riot offered replacement cards, limited to three per person and six per household. Vendetta, the fourth set, was the first to receive simultaneous English and Chinese releases, a practice that will be maintained for all subsequent sets. On June 26 2026, Riot announced that a Korean release of Origins was scheduled for September 2026.

== Gameplay ==
A typical game of Riftbound involves two or more players who engage in a battle representing a Champion from the League of Legends universe. Every player must bring their own main deck and rune deck, along with a Champion Legend and a number of Battlefields determined by the selected game mode. The rune deck consists of 12 rune cards which serve as resource for playing cards from the main deck. The main deck must contain at least 40 cards, including spells, units and gear cards. Points are scored by capturing and holding Battlefields. The first player or team to reach the target score (set by the game mode) wins.

== Sets ==
#	Set name	Set code	Release date	Size	Notes	Ref.
1	Origins	OGN	October 31, 2025	298		
2	Spiritforged	SFD	February 13, 2026	221	Introduced equippable gear and five new keywords (Repeat, Unique, Quick-Draw, Equip, Weaponmaster) .	
3	Unleashed	UNL	May 8, 2026	219	Introduced several new keywords (Ambush, Level, Hunt) and the Ultimate card rarity.	
4	Vendetta	VEN	July 31, 2026	166	Introduced three new keywords (Burn, Flow, Empower).	
5	Radiance	RAD	October 23, 2026	180	Introduced three new keywords (Show Off, Deploy, Disarm).	
6	Legacy	LGC	January 29, 2027	346		
7	The Reckoning	REC	April 30, 2027	264		
8	Set 8		Q3 2027			
9	Set 9		Q4 2027			

== Reception ==
Hamish Hector, writing for TechRadar, praised Riftbound for being easy to pick up for newcomers, even those without prior TCG experience, while still offering tactical depth. Lauren Bergin of PCGamesN highlighted the unique feeling of different champions, but expressed concerns about the game's longevity in an already saturated market where it needs to compete with other TCGs such as Magic: The Gathering, Pokémon Trading Card Game, and Disney Lorcana.
