= Convergence: A League of Legends Story =

- Developer: Double Stallion
- Publisher: Riot Forge
- Director: Eric Angelillo
- Designers: Vincent Hippoman; Patric Mondou
- Programmer: Stéphane Beniak
- Artists: Etienne Marie; Eric Angelillo
- Writers: Kelly Hornung; Lee Thomas
- Composers: FX Dupas; Mathieu Lavoie; François Beauvais
- Engine: Unity
- Platforms: PlayStation 4; PlayStation 5; Nintendo Switch; Windows; Xbox One; Xbox Series
- Release: WW: May 23, 2023
- Genre: Metroidvania
- Mode: Single-player

Convergence: A League of Legends Story is a 2023 Metroidvania video game developed by Double Stallion and published by Riot Forge. Players control an inventor who can manipulate time. It is a spinoff of League of Legends and was released for Windows, PlayStation 4 and 5, Xbox One and Series X/S, and Nintendo Switch.

== Gameplay ==
Players control an inventor named Ekko who comes from the fictional city of Zaun in the League of Legends franchise. Convergence is a Metroidvania video game, a subgenre of platform games that encourage exploration through a side scrolling world. Players can use Ekko's inventions for several purposes: reversing time to prevent Ekko from missing a jump or taking damage in combat; remotely flip switches; slow down time to make it safer to get past dangerous hazards; teleport; and attack enemies from a distance.

== Development ==
Developer Double Stallion is based in Montreal, Canada. Riot Forge released Convergence: A League of Legends Story for Windows, PlayStation 4 and 5, Xbox One and Series X/S, and Nintendo Switch on May 23, 2023.

== Reception ==
Reception

Aggregate scores
Aggregator	Score
Metacritic	PC: 81/100; NS: 75/100; PS5: 81/100
OpenCritic	80/100; 83% Critics Recommend

On Metacritic, the Windows and PlayStation 5 versions received positive reviews, and the Switch version received mixed reviews. GamesRadar called it an excellent Metroidvania-style game whose dystopian setting "is only held back by its slightly cartoonish" graphics. Polygon said it is "a great adventure" as long as players do not expect it to be similar to Arcane, an animated adaptation of League of Legends with the same setting. Siliconera called it "an excellent blend of 2D parkour platforming and brawling" and said it will likely appeal to gamers who have not played League of Legends. GamingBolt, who felt it is "a compelling side-story for Ekko", praised the gameplay and visuals.
