= 2XKO =

2026 video game

- Developer: Riot Games
- Publisher: Riot Games
- Director: Shaun Rivera
- Producer: Tom Cannon
- Designers: Seth Killian; Daniel Maniago
- Artists: Jessica Oyhenart; Katon Callaway
- Composers: Jesse Zuretti; Casey Edwards; Mike Pitman
- Series: League of Legends
- Engine: Unreal Engine
- Platforms: PlayStation 5; Windows; Xbox Series X/S
- Release: January 20, 2026: Windows, PlayStation 5, Xbox Series X/S; WW: January 20, 2026 (Note: Early access launch on October 7, 2025)
- Genre: Fighting
- Mode: Multiplayer

2XKO is a free-to-play fighting game developed by Riot Games, set in the Runeterra universe from League of Legends. It released for PlayStation 5, Windows, and Xbox Series X/S on January 20, 2026.

== Gameplay ==
Pre-release gameplay screenshot

2XKO is a 2v2 tag-team fighting game where players select two characters from the League of Legends universe. The game emphasizes strategic team play, allowing players to switch between their Point (primary) and Assist (secondary) characters using a tag system. Players can move their characters using standard directional inputs.

The game includes dashes, jumps, and air dashes to enhance mobility. The control scheme features light, medium, and heavy attacks, with each character having unique normal and special moves that can be executed using specific button combinations. Special moves are performed with a combination of directional inputs and attack buttons. Supers, which are powerful moves that consume meter, can be executed by pressing either light, medium, or heavy, and a special move button. The tag system allows players to swap between their Point and Assist characters using a handshake tag, enabling dynamic combos and strategic play. Players can call in their Assist for support or switch to them to continue a combo.

The game includes various defensive options to enhance gameplay. Players can block incoming attacks by holding back on the directional input. Pushblocking is a mechanic that allows players to push their opponent away, creating space and disrupting their offense. Players can also parry attacks, negating damage and creating opportunities for counterattacks. Each character has different abilities and playstyles; for example, Ahri is known for her mobility and zoning capabilities, Darius is a mid-range fighter with powerful and brutal attacks, and Ekko uses time manipulation for tricky and unpredictable moves. The Fuse system allows players to customize their duos' synergies and playstyles, increasing the strategic depth of the game by enabling players to tailor their team composition to their preferred playstyle. The game offers various game modes, including private matches and a training mode.

=== Characters ===
The game featured 11 playable champions when it launched in early access, with additional characters planned to be added post-launch. The following characters have been officially announced for inclusion:

Release Patch	Character	Details
Season 0	Ahri	
Season 0	Ekko	
Season 0	Yasuo	
Season 0	Darius	
Season 0	Illaoi	
Season 0	Braum	
Season 0	Jinx	
Season 0	Vi	
Season 0	Blitzcrank	
Season 0	Teemo	
Season 0	Warwick	
Season 1	Caitlyn	
Season 1	Akali	
Season 1	Senna	
Season 1	Thresh	

== Development ==
Initially announced in 2019 as Project L, the game was later rebranded to 2XKO. It is being developed by Riot Games in their Los Angeles, Sydney and San Francisco Bay Area studios, formerly known as Radiant Entertainment, and was released in January 2026 for PlayStation 5 and Xbox Series X/S. The game was made available in early access for PC on October 7, 2025. Music was a key part of the game design that Jesse Zuretti worked on, based on briefs from Mike Pittman and Eugene Kong about each character; with the key challenge being making a fighting game soundtrack feel exactly like it should.

=== Early access ===
A closed beta for 2XKO launched on September 9, 2025, featuring ten playable characters. During the beta period, Riot Games released several patches that addressed character balance, improved matchmaking, and fixed bugs. The closed beta received a positive response from players and press, with reviewers noting the depth of the tag-team system and the effectiveness of the parry mechanic. On September 25, 2025, Riot Games announced that the closed beta would transition directly into early access on October 7, 2025, skipping the typical gap between beta and launch phases. Early access launched exclusively on PC as a free-to-play title alongside Season 0, which introduced the first seasonal content including a Battle Pass and combo trials for all characters. The early access version added an eleventh character, Warwick, and introduced combo trials with 23 trials per champion across four difficulty levels.

=== Console launch and Season 1 ===
On January 20, 2026, 2XKO launched on PlayStation 5 and Xbox Series X/S alongside the beginning of Season 1 on all platforms. The console release included cross-platform play and shared account progression between PC and consoles. Season 1 introduced Caitlyn as a new playable champion, a new Battle Pass, and the Frame Perfect competitive skin line, with a portion of sales directed toward funding community tournament prize pools and production costs. Riot outlined a plan for five seasons per year, each approximately ten weeks long and featuring a new champion.

=== Post-launch team restructuring ===
On February 9, 2026, less than three weeks after the console launch, Riot Games announced a significant reduction to the 2XKO development team. Approximately 80 roles were eliminated, representing roughly half of the game’s global development staff. Executive producer Tom Cannon attributed the decision to player engagement that had not met expectations, stating that while the game had attracted a dedicated core audience, overall momentum was insufficient to sustain a team of that size. Riot stated that plans for the 2026 Competitive Series remained unchanged and that affected employees would receive a minimum of six months’ severance or be given the opportunity to transfer to other roles within the company. The decision drew considerable attention within the gaming industry, with commentators noting the contrast between the game’s lengthy development cycle of approximately ten years and the speed of the post-launch staff reduction.

On August 20, 2026, Riot Games announced that 2XKO will end active development by the end of 2026. They stated that the servers will remain online and playable on all platforms and that all characters will become unlocked, refunding money to those who have made any in-game purchases at any time before or on the day of their announcement.

== Competitive scene ==
During early access, Riot Games launched the First Impact program to support competitive play, sponsoring 22 community-run tournaments through the remainder of 2025. By the end of 2025, over 1,500 community-organised tournaments had taken place worldwide. Rather than establishing a developer-run professional league as it does with League of Legends and Valorant, Riot opted to partner directly with existing fighting game community tournament organisers. For 2026, the company announced the 2XKO Competitive Series comprising 20 Riot-sanctioned events: five Majors and 15 Challenger-level tournaments across five seasons. The first Major was held at the Frosty Faustings XVIII fighting game event on January 29, 2026.

== Reception ==
Reception

Aggregate scores
Aggregator	Score
Metacritic	(PC) 81/100 (PS5) 78/100
OpenCritic	100% recommend

Review scores
Publication	Score
Eurogamer	4/5
IGN	8/10
Metro	3.5/5

The PC and PlayStation 5 versions of 2XKO both received generally favorable reviews from critics, according to the review aggregation website Metacritic. Fellow review aggregator OpenCritic assessed that the game received strong approval, being recommended by 100% of critics.

It was nominated for "Best Fighting Game" at The Game Awards 2025, and for "Fighting Game of the Year" at the 29th Annual D.I.C.E. Awards, but lost against Fatal Fury: City of the Wolves and Mortal Kombat: Legacy Kollection, respectively. The game was again nominated for "Best Fighting Game" at The Game Awards 2026.

The game reached #3 in the North American download charts, and #10 in Europe in January 2026.
