= The Mageseeker =

The Mageseeker: A League of Legends Story
- Developer: Digital Sun
- Publisher: Riot Forge
- Series: League of Legends
- Engine: Unity
- Platforms: Microsoft Windows; Nintendo Switch; PlayStation 4; PlayStation 5; Xbox One; Xbox Series X/S
- Release: April 18, 2023
- Genre: Action role-playing
- Mode: Single-player

The Mageseeker: A League of Legends Story is an action role-playing video game developed by Digital Sun and published by Riot Forge. A spin-off game of the League of Legends franchise, the game was released for Microsoft Windows, Nintendo Switch, PlayStation 4, PlayStation 5, Xbox One and Xbox Series X/S in April 2023.

== Gameplay ==
The game story follows Sylas, as he escapes captivity and leads a group of rebel mages for a revolution against the tyrannical kingdom of Demacia. The Mageseeker is a 2D action role-playing video game played from a top-down perspective. Sylas can dash and use his chains to pull himself towards hostile opponents. He can cast a wide range of elemental spells, though he can also temporarily borrow enemies' magical abilities for one-time use in combat. In addition to the main campaign, the game also features side quests, allowing players to assault enemy bases or complete arena challenges.

== Development ==
The game was developed by Spanish studio Digital Sun, the studio behind Moonlighter (2018). The game was officially announced by Riot Forge in February 2023, and was released for Microsoft Windows, Nintendo Switch, PlayStation 4, PlayStation 5, Xbox One and Xbox Series X/S in April 2023.

== Reception ==
Reception

Aggregate scores
Aggregator	Score
Metacritic	PC: 78/100; NS: 81/100; PS5: 74/100; XONE: 82/100
OpenCritic	78/100; 79% Critics Recommend

According to review aggregator website Metacritic, the game received "Generally Favorable" reviews upon release.
