= Song of Nunu =

Song of Nunu: A League of Legends Story
- Developer: Tequila Works
- Publisher: Riot Forge
- Platforms: Nintendo Switch; Windows; PlayStation 4; PlayStation 5; Xbox One; Xbox Series
- Release: WW: November 1, 2023
- Genre: Platformer
- Mode: Single-player

Song of Nunu: A League of Legends Story is a 2023 platform video game developed by Tequila Works and published by Riot Forge.

== Gameplay ==
Players control Nunu, a character from League of Legends, as he searches for a magical item called the Heart of the Blue. Song of Nunu is a platformer in which players must jump over hazards, solve puzzles, and engage in snowball fights. There are some areas where stealth or combat is necessary. Nunu is accompanied by Willump, a yeti, who assists him.

== Development ==
Riot Forge released Song of Nunu for Windows and Switch on November 1, 2023. Ports are planned for Xbox One, Xbox Series X/S, and PlayStation 4 and 5.

== Reception ==
Reception

Aggregate scores
Aggregator	Score
Metacritic	PC: 75/100; NS: 75/100; PS5: 73/100
OpenCritic	75/100; 61% Critics Recommend

Review scores
Publication	Score
Destructoid	8/10
Digital Trends	4/5
Shacknews	7/10
CGMagazine	5.5/10

Song of Nunu received positive reviews on Metacritic. Rock Paper Shotgun said that knowledge of League of Legends is unnecessary to enjoy the game, which they thought was a "heartfelt, winsome platformer". Polygon felt that giving Nunu and Willump their own adventure made them more appealing and said watching them play together was a joy. Although they enjoyed the narrative and characters, PCGamesN found the gameplay bland and experienced both software bugs and performance issues. They recommended buying it on sale. Shacknews said the presentation of the cinematics can be off-putting, and they felt the combat feels tacked-on. However, they said it is "a solid entry" and a game that can be recommended to all ages. Nintendo Life called it "a great addition" to the League of Legends spinoffs and recommended it to fans of The Legend of Zelda.
