= Ruined King =

Ruined King: A League of Legends Story
- Developer: Airship Syndicate
- Publisher: Riot Forge
- Director: Joe Madureira
- Writer: Frank Barbiere
- Composer: Gareth Coker
- Series: League of Legends
- Engine: Unity
- Platforms: Nintendo Switch; PlayStation 4; Windows; Xbox One; PlayStation 5; Xbox Series X/S
- Release: Switch, PS4, Win, X1; November 16, 2021; PS5, Xbox Series X/S; March 2, 2023
- Genre: Role-playing
- Mode: Single-player

Ruined King: A League of Legends Story is a 2021 turn-based role-playing video game developed by Airship Syndicate and published by Riot Forge. A spin-off to Riot Games' League of Legends, Ruined King uses characters and a setting originating in its parent title.

The game is set in Bilgewater, a bustling pirate city, and the Shadow Isles, a cursed region filled with a corrupting force called the Black Mist. The player controls a party of six characters from League of Legends to find the source of the Black Mist. The playable characters are Pyke, Braum, Miss Fortune, Illaoi, Ahri, and Yasuo.

Originally revealed in 2019 during the 10th-anniversary celebration of League of Legends, Ruined King's release was delayed as a result of the COVID-19 pandemic. A release date was not provided by the developer or publisher until it was launched, alongside Hextech Mayhem, on November 16, 2021 for Nintendo Switch, PlayStation 4, Windows, and Xbox One. Versions for PlayStation 5 and Xbox Series X/S were released on March 2, 2023.

== Gameplay ==
Like Airship Syndicate's Battle Chasers: Nightwar, Ruined King A League of Legends Story is presented in a top-down perspective, with players directly navigating a party of characters around the world and through dungeons. As the group travels, they encounter enemies and bosses. When an enemy is encountered, the environment switches to a turn-based battle area in which characters and enemies await their turn to attack.

Each of the main characters has a passive and active Dungeon Ability that players can use while traversing the world map, but the group can contain only three characters at one time out of a possible six and only one character can be present on the map at a time, so the player must anticipate which abilities will be useful. Passive abilities will trigger in the right context, while active abilities have a cooldown and will give the player combat advantages when used on enemies. The game will often require the player to select a particular character for story progression or to obtain a rare item: Illaoi, as one of the Buhru people, is the only member of the team who can decipher Buhru text and artifacts, so she is a necessary inclusion for the Buhru Temple.

The combat of Ruined King differs from traditional turn-based combat due to a mechanic called the Initiative Bar: it displays a timeline upon which every combatant (there can be up to six, three allies and three enemies) has a position, showing when they will act and sometimes giving information on enemy abilities. Some abilities are Instant, but some have the option to select a Lane of the Bar: Speed, Balance or Power, forcing the player to consider the trade-off between a weaker ability sooner or a stronger one later. Some abilities allow a character to move another character on the Bar, speeding up an ally or knocking back an enemy. Placing abilities in the right order can be important, for example when executing a synergetic combo, interrupting an enemy's ability before they can use it, and when trying to hit Boons or avoid Hazards, areas of the Initiative Bar that can infer bonuses or maluses on any character that lands within them. Some bosses are 'puzzle bosses' that are beaten more by mastery of the Initiative Bar than by damage alone.

Each character has three Ultimate abilities that they can unlock over the course of the game. Using an Ultimate requires filling a level gauge and each Ultimate has a level cost; typically each character's ultimates will cost 1, 2 or 3 levels, each stronger than the last. The Ultimate gauge carries over between battles but is shared between party members. The effects Ultimates have can vary greatly depending on the character's role: they can be purely damage-focused, buff or debuff, or even revive fallen allies.

The game reuses the Overcharge mechanic from Battle Chasers: Nightwar: during battle, non-magical attacks generate Overcharge that can be used in place of mana. This is useful for dungeons or longer fights in which being economical with mana is a consideration.

== Plot ==
=== Setting and characters ===
Ruined King: A League of Legends Story takes the player on a journey through Bilgewater and the Shadow Isles, regions of the world of Runeterra, the canon setting of League of Legends.

Bilgewater is a port city in the Serpent Isles, and a town of outlaws, opportunity, and anarchy. The only law is that of the pirate captains', chief among whom is Gangplank, the Saltwater Scourge: a ruthless captain of the Dreadway and leader of the Jagged Hooks gang. Sarah Fortune saw Gangplank kill her mother with the selfsame pistols he commissioned from her. Now a grown woman and a captain in her own right, Fortune has taken back the pistols that are her birthright and with them her revenge, blowing up the Dreadway with Gangplank on it. Fortune seeks to rule Bilgewater, but some remaining captains oppose her rule. Fortune is torn between her desire to be a fairer ruler than Gangplank and the anger she has nursed over the long years of plotting her revenge. Unbeknownst to her, Gangplank yet lives: Illaoi of the indigenous Buhru people, Priestess of Nagakaboros and his former lover, pulled him from the deep. Gangplank schemes and bides his time, making unusual allies in a bid to reclaim the throne that was usurped from him.

The nearby Shadow Isles are Runeterra's domain of the undead, a land in which tormented spirits are trapped by a supernatural force called the Black Mist. Every year the Mist rolls across the sea, seeking fresh souls to damn in an event known as the Harrowing. Bilgewater is the Harrowing's first port of call, and over the years the Harrowings have been growing worse. But the Shadow Isles were not always thus: long ago, they were known as the Blessed Isles, and home to an advanced civilization living in a land of lush nature, sustained by a well of magical life-giving waters. King Viego of Camavor came to the Blessed Isles, seeking the waters to revive his love, Isolde. The natives denied him: the waters could cure any illness or injury, but no power could reverse death without dire consequences. In a fit of grief and rage, Viego commanded his army to slay whoever stood in his way and had Grael (later Thresh) lead him to the waters. Isolde was revived, but as a ghostly image of herself, and in her suffering killed Viego with his own sword. This caused a cataclysmic event later known as the Ruination, killing everyone on the Isles and turning them into tormented shades. In the present, Viego, now resurrected as the Ruined King, rules the Isles in a weakened state, desperately seeking a way to bring back Isolde. Thresh pretends to be his loyal servant, but the arrival of a vengeful Gangplank may be exactly the opportunity he needs.

=== Story ===
Gangplank aligns with Thresh and collects many artifacts in order to revive Viego on the Shadow Isles. Most of the artifacts belong to the Buhru people on the Serpent Isles. Illaoi, a Buhru Priestess, receives a vision from her goddess that she must travel to the Shadow Isles. As she looks for Captain Fortune, Illaoi meets Braum and Yasuo, two travelers from far-off lands. Braum seeks the life-giving waters to cure a plague in his homeland of Freljord, while Yasuo was hired to protect Ahri, who has since run away from him to the Shadow Isles. As they travel, they find out Bilgewater was again attacked by the Black Mist from the Shadow Isles and Illaoi's temple was invaded by Gangplank. They meet Fortune and, after some tense discussion, resolve to form a party and set sail for the Shadow Isles together.

On the way they meet Pyke, the Bloodharbour Ripper, an undying murderer of mysterious origin and motivation. While he normally targets pirate captains, he says that he now wishes to only kill Gangplank; although the rest of the team is wary, Illaoi says that this is the will of her goddess and allows him to join them. As they reach the Shadow Isles, they travel through the Coastal Academy and reach the Grove. Maokai, a living tree who is guardian of the Grove, mistakes them for intruders and attacks—but before they can cut Maokai down, Ahri intervenes. Ahri reveals that she is the last of the Vesani, a race of fox-like people who have ties to the Isles. She entreats the party to help Maokai purify the corruption in his roots. By overcoming trials within an underwater Buhru temple, they gain the power necessary to help Maokai. In return, he clears the way deeper into the Isles and gives Braum some of what little remains of the untainted waters of life.

Meanwhile, Gangplank has assembled enough artifacts to revive Viego. Viego is restored, but still requires time to gather his power. Thresh keeps Gangplank interested by promising him Viego's throne. Thresh soon has a showdown with the party, who invade Thresh's dungeons and release many of the souls trapped inside; although defeated, Thresh tells the party that the fight was just a distraction and that his plan is already in motion. They rush to Gangplank and Viego, but their pleas to Gangplank falling on deaf ears. While attempting to take Viego's power, Gangplank is possessed by Viego, forcing the party to fight him. Gangplank is defeated, but Viego remains at large and extends the Black Mist to Bilgewater, convinced (by Thresh) that the key to resurrecting Isolde is there—and that anyone in his way deserves to die for keeping him from his love.

The party imprisons Gangplank and sets about finding a way to stop Viego. The Black Mist that protects him proves impenetrable, so to defeat him they need a way to weaken his resolve. They travel to a Vesani research institute, where Ahri learns much of her heritage—including how her people were skilled in the art of emotion and memory manipulation—but is forced to choose between saving the memories of her people or acquiring Viego's memories. Making peace with her past, Ahri sacrifices the Vesani records to get the memories they need, through which they learn that Viego's relationship with Isolde was not as perfect as his delusions say.

On the way back, Viego causes a storm, which forces the party to land on a remote island. The island houses secrets of Yasuo's past, forcing him to confront the memory of his older brother, Yone. Yasuo was falsely accused of the murder of an elder he was supposed to protect, and when Yone chased him down and confronted him, Yasuo killed Yone in the ensuing duel. By reliving the memory, Yasuo is finally able to come to terms with his guilt and resolves to stop running from his problems. The party returns to Bilgewater and prepares for the final fight with Viego.

They sail out to meet the Black Mist at sea. Ahri uses her Vesani magic to return Viego's memories to him, reminding him of how possessive and cruel he was to Isolde, causing his resolve to falter and weakening the Black Mist that protects him. Viego resists as best he can, possessing members of the party to turn against their allies, but is ultimately defeated. Before the final blow is struck, Viego pleads with Fortune, saying he can give her the power she wants, but she turns him down and traps him inside a Buhru artifact.

Bilgewater is saved. The party discuss what they will do next before going their separate ways: most of them seem to have overcome their inner demons, but Illaoi worries that Fortune's second brush with Gangplank has re-awakened her darker side, especially given that Gangplank escaped during the final fight. Her worries are later proven true, as Fortune goes after Gangplank and his followers with unrelenting bloodlust. Pyke, too, has unfinished business: his target has switched from Gangplank to Viego who, for now, remains in the artifact.

== Reception ==
Reception

Aggregate scores
Aggregator	Score
Metacritic	(PC) 80/100 (PS4) 77/100 (XONE) 84/100 (NS) 83/100
OpenCritic	80/100; 67% Critics Recommend

Review scores
Publication	Score
Game Informer	7/10
GameSpot	8/10
IGN	8/10
Jeuxvideo.com	16/20
Nintendo Life	9/10
PC Gamer (US)	75/100
RPGFan	84/100

Ruined King received "generally positive" reviews according to review aggregator Metacritic.

Game Informer gave the game a seven out of ten, citing the game's action and imaginative characters as pillars that supported an otherwise conventional RPG with a forgettable story and uninspired level design. PC Gamer similarly called the cast of Ruined King an "entertaining bunch" and the combat "the heart of the game", while criticizing the uninteresting story and the lack of exciting content. IGN praised the game's art, voice acting, character development, and rewarding battle system while lamenting the presence of some major technical issues, the limited variety of locations, and the autosave system. GameSpot and Nintendo Life both called the game's story "incredible", and similarly lauded its world, characters, and battle system while deeming the technical issues and limited fast travel system to be annoyances.
