= League of Legends =

Multiplayer video game developed by Riot Games

- Logo variant from 2019
- Developer: Riot Games
- Publisher: Riot Games
- Director: Andrei van Roon
- Engine: Hextech Engine
- Platforms: Windows; macOS
- Release: October 27, 2009: Windows; October 27, 2009; macOS; March 1, 2013
- Genre: MOBA
- Mode: Multiplayer

League of Legends (LoL), commonly referred to as League, is a multiplayer online battle arena video game developed and published by Riot Games. Inspired by Defense of the Ancients, a custom map for Warcraft III, Riot's founders sought to develop a stand-alone game in the same genre. Since its release in October 2009, League has been free-to-play and is monetized through purchasable character customization. The game is available for Windows and macOS.

In the game's main mode, Summoner's Rift, two teams of five players battle in player-versus-player combat. Each player controls a character, known as a "champion", with unique abilities and styles of play. During a match, champions become more powerful by collecting experience points, earning gold, and purchasing items to defeat the opposing team. Teams defend their base and win by pushing toward the enemy base and destroying a large structure within it, the "Nexus".

League of Legends has received generally favorable reviews, which have highlighted its accessibility, character designs, and production value. The game's long lifespan has resulted in a critical reappraisal, with reviews trending favorably; it is widely considered one of the greatest video games ever made. However, rude and abusive in-game player behavior, criticized since the game's early days, persists despite Riot's attempts to fix the problem. In 2019, League regularly peaked at eight million concurrent players, and its popularity has led to tie-ins such as music, comic books, short stories, and the animated series Arcane. Its success has spawned several spin-off video games, including a mobile version, a digital collectible card game, a trading card game, and a turn-based role-playing game, among others. An MMORPG based on the property is in development.

League of Legends is the world's largest esport, with an international competitive scene consisting of multiple regional leagues which culminates in an annual League of Legends World Championship. The 2019 event registered over 100 million unique viewers, peaking at a concurrent viewership of 44 million during the finals. Domestic and international events have been broadcast on livestreaming websites such as Twitch, YouTube, Bilibili, and the cable television sports channel ESPN.

== Gameplay ==
Four champions in the bottom lane of Summoner's Rift, surrounded by minions. The red health bars indicate that they are opposing players.

League of Legends is a multiplayer online battle arena (MOBA) game in which the player controls a character ("champion") with a set of unique abilities from an isometric perspective. During a match, champions gain levels by accruing experience points (XP) through killing enemies. Items can be acquired to increase champions' strength, and are bought with gold, which players accrue passively over time and earn actively by defeating the opposing team's minions, champions, or defensive structures. In the main game mode, Summoner's Rift, items are purchased through a shop menu available to players only when their champion is in the team's base. Each match is discrete; levels and items do not transfer from one match to another.

=== Summoner's Rift ===
A simplified representation of Summoner's Rift. The yellow paths are the "lanes" down which minions march; blue and red dots represent turrets. The fountains are the dark areas within each base, and are beside each Nexus. The dotted black line indicates the river.

Summoner's Rift is the flagship game mode of League of Legends and the most prominent in professional-level play. The mode has a ranked competitive ladder; a matchmaking system determines a player's skill level and generates a starting rank from which they can climb. There are ten tiers; the least skilled are Iron, Bronze, and Silver, and the highest are Master, Grandmaster, and Challenger. (Note: Earlier, there were seven tiers: Bronze, Silver, Gold, Platinum, Diamond, Master, and Challenger. Iron and Grandmaster were added in 2018, and Emerald (a tier between Platinum and Diamond) in 2023.)

Two teams of five players compete to destroy the opposing team's "Nexus", which is guarded by the enemy champions and defensive structures known as "turrets". Each team's Nexus is in its base, where players start the game and reappear after death. Non-player characters known as minions are generated from each team's Nexus and advance toward the enemy base along three lanes guarded by turrets: top, middle, and bottom. Each team's base contains three "inhibitors", one behind the third tower from the center of each lane. Destroying an enemy team's inhibitor causes stronger allied minions to spawn in that lane and allows the attacking team to damage the enemy Nexus and the two turrets guarding it. The regions in between the lanes are known as the "jungle", which is inhabited by "monsters" that, like minions, respawn at regular intervals. Like minions, monsters provide gold and XP when killed. Another, more powerful class of monster resides within the river that separates each team's jungle. These monsters require multiple players to defeat and grant special abilities to their slayers' team. For example, teams can gain a powerful allied unit after killing the Rift Herald, permanent strength boosts by killing dragons, and stronger, more durable minions by killing Baron Nashor.

Summoner's Rift matches can last from 15 minutes to over an hour. Typically, one player goes in the top lane, one in the middle lane, one in the jungle, and two in the bottom lane. Players in a lane kill minions to accumulate gold and XP (termed "farming") and try to prevent their opponent from doing the same. A fifth champion, known as a "jungler", farms the jungle monsters and, when powerful enough, assists their teammates in a lane.

=== Other modes ===
Besides Summoner's Rift, League of Legends has two other permanent game modes. ARAM ("All Random, All Mid") is a five-versus-five mode like Summoner's Rift, but on a map called Howling Abyss with only one long lane, no jungle area, and champions randomly chosen for players. Given the small size of the map, players must be vigilant in avoiding enemy abilities.

Teamfight Tactics is an auto battler released in June 2019 and made a permanent game mode the next month. As with others in its genre, players build a team and battle to be the last one standing. Players do not directly affect combat; they purchase units from a shop and position them on a board to fight automatically against an opponent each round. The game's available units and mechanics change seasonally, commonly known as "sets", with 17 unique sets across its first 7 years. Some sets are occasionally made available to play again with altered mechanics. The game's engine will change to Unreal Engine with the premiere of its 18th set in mid-2026. Teamfight Tactics is available for iOS and Android, with cross-platform play between Windows and macOS clients.

Other game modes have been made available temporarily, typically aligning with in-game events. Ultra Rapid Fire (URF) mode was available for two weeks as a 2014 April Fools Day prank. In the mode, champion abilities have no resource cost, significantly reduced cooldown timers, increased movement speed, reduced healing, and faster attacks. In April 2015, Riot disclosed that it had not brought the mode back because its unbalanced design resulted in player "burnout". Riot also said the costs associated with maintaining and balancing URF were too high. Other temporary modes include One for All and Nexus Blitz. One for All has players pick a champion for all members of their team to play. In Nexus Blitz, players participated in a series of mini-games on a compressed map. League of Legends Classic, a mode restoring the visuals and gameplay of the game's early life, was announced in June 2026, with the full release set for late July.

== Development ==
=== Pre-release ===
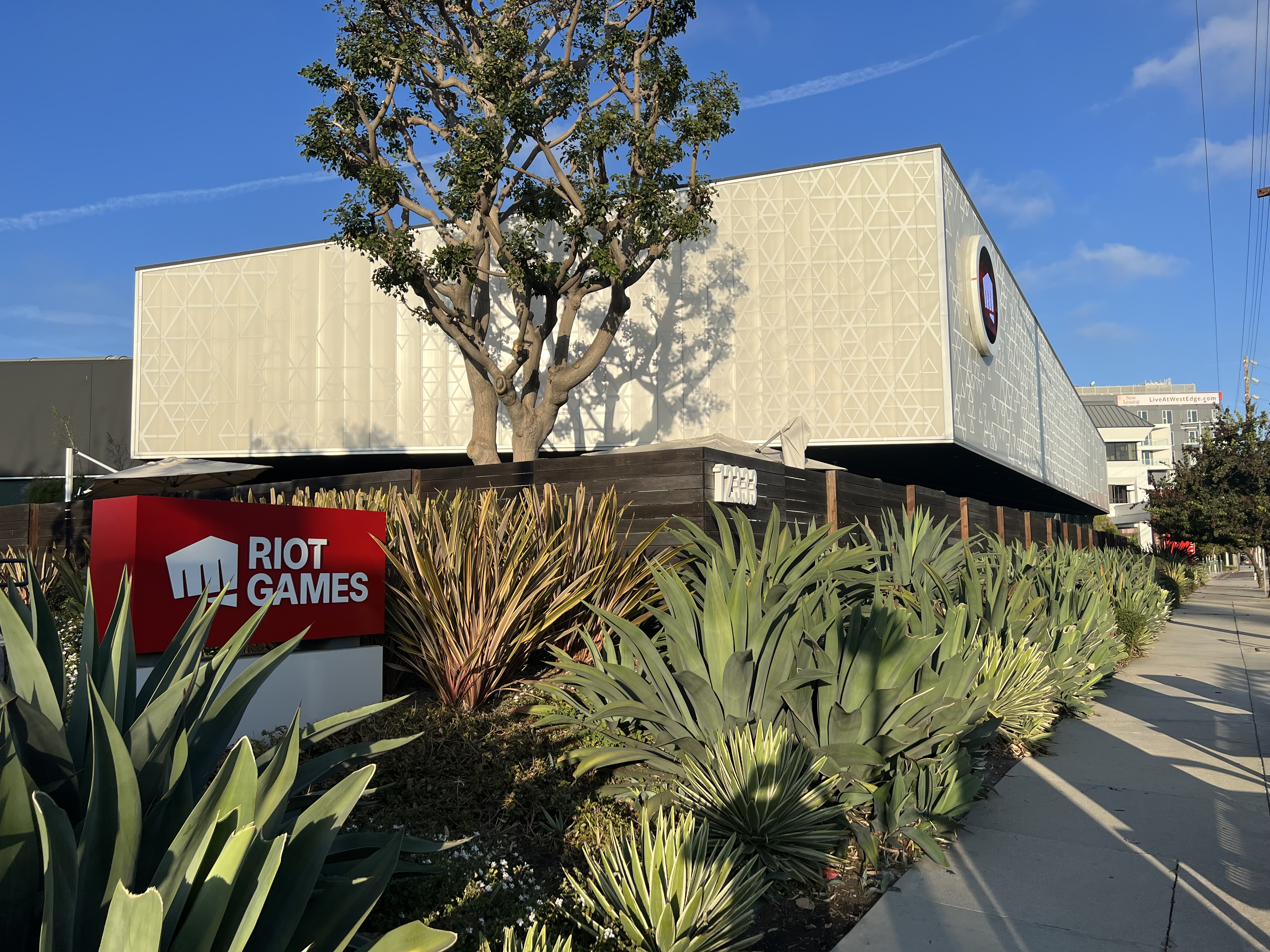
Riot Games's West Los Angeles headquarters

Riot Games's founders Brandon Beck and Marc Merill had an idea for a spiritual successor to Defense of the Ancients, known as DotA. A mod for Warcraft III: Reign of Chaos, DotA required players to buy Warcraft III and install custom software; The Washington Post's Brian Crecente said the mod "lacked a level of polish and was often hard to find and set up". Phillip Kollar of Polygon noted that Blizzard Entertainment supported Warcraft III with an expansion pack, then shifted their focus to other projects while the game still had players. Beck and Merill sought to create a game that would be supported over a significantly longer period.

Beck and Merill held a DotA tournament for students at the University of Southern California, with an ulterior goal of recruitment. There they met Jeff Jew, later a producer on League of Legends. Jew was very familiar with DotA and spent much of the tournament teaching others how to play. Beck and Merill invited him to an interview, and he joined Riot Games as an intern. Beck and Merill recruited two figures involved with DotA: Steve Feak, one of its designers, and Steve Mescon, who ran a support website to assist players. Feak said early development was highly iterative, comparing it to designing DotA.

A demonstration of League of Legends built in the Warcraft III game engine was completed in four months and then shown at the 2007 Game Developers Conference. There, Beck and Merill had little success with potential investors. Publishers were confused by the game's free-to-play business model and lack of a single-player mode. The free-to-play model was untested outside of Asian markets, so publishers were primarily interested in a retail release, and the game's capacity for a sequel. In 2008, Riot reached an agreement with holding company Tencent to oversee the game's launch in China.

League of Legends was announced on October 7, 2008, for Microsoft Windows. Closed beta-testing began in April 2009. Upon the launch of the beta, 17 champions were available. Riot initially aimed to ship the game with 20 champions but doubled the number before the game's full release in North America on October 27, 2009. The game's full name was announced as League of Legends: Clash of Fates. Riot planned to use the subtitle to signal when future content was available, but decided it was silly and dropped it before launch.

=== Post-release ===
League of Legends receives regular updates in the form of patches. Although previous games had utilized patches to ensure no one strategy dominated, League of Legends' patches made keeping pace with the developer's changes a core part of the game. In 2014, Riot standardized its patch cadence to once approximately every two or three weeks. These updates change the effectiveness of strategies within the game, known as the metagame; update content is determined by the developer using a combination of gameplay data and product goals.

The development team includes hundreds of game designers and artists. In 2016, the music team had four full-time composers and a team of producers creating audio for the game and its promotional materials. As of 2025, the game has 173 champions, and Riot Games periodically overhauls the visuals and gameplay of the oldest in the roster. Although only available for Microsoft Windows at launch, a Mac version of the game was made available in 2013.

The game utilizes Riot's custom always-online anti-cheat software, Vanguard, on Microsoft Windows devices since May 2023. Originally developed by Riot for its tactical shooter Valorant (2020), Vanguard requires access to a device's kernel, which some users regarded as unnecessarily intrusive. Vanguard does not collect or send user data to Riot Games. Following Vanguard's deployment, some players said it bricked their devices; the studio said these had other causes and impacted a small number of players.

News of a large-scale update to the game, internally titled "League News", was reported by Cecilia D'Anastasio of Bloomberg News in December 2005. Riot Games published a video response to the report, indicating their intention to replace the game's client, overhaul the game's visuals, and improve the new player experience. PC Gamer's Andy Chalk linked the League Next initiative to League of Legends's aging player base and its failure to attract new players.

=== Revenue model ===
League of Legends uses a free-to-play business model. Revenue is generated by selling cosmetic goods with no impact to gameplay. Several of these cosmetics—for example, "skins" that change the appearance of champions—can be redeemed after purchasing an in-game currency called Riot Points (RP). As virtual goods, they have high profit margins. An Ubisoft analyst estimated in 2014 that 4% of players were paying customers—significantly lower than the industry standard—and suggested that revenue optimization was likely not a priority because of the game's large player base. A 2016 analysis by SuperData estimated the game's monthly revenues at $150 million per month. At the 2024 Summer Game Fest, game director Pu Liu said that revenue is primarily generated by a "single-digit percentage" of players, colloquially known as whales.

Skins have five basic tiers, ranging in cost from $4 to $25. Riot Games added an additional skin tier to League of Legends in 2024, describing them as a luxury good. These skins cannot be purchased outright: instead, players buy attempts to win the skin via a slot machine. Some commentators identified this as a gacha game mechanic, used by Riot since 2023 in Teamfight Tactics. Players are guaranteed to acquire the skin after a predefined number of failed attempts. The cost can range from $200 to $430. Responses to early skins in this tier divided players. The first was criticized for being a recolored variant of an existing skin, known as a "chroma". The developer released several more of these, with a YouTube content creator known for showcasing upcoming skins for the company describing the tier as a "scam".

One day after revealing a $430 "Hall of Fame" skin to honor the career of professional gamer Faker, Riot announced layoffs at the company, impacting Ben Rosado—the cosmetic's designer—and eliciting further negative responses from players. In early 2025, Riot announced a new skin in the tier that had been long requested by players. PC Gamer's Rick Lane described the strategy as "whale chasing" and "psychological manipulation". He said that the skins had been selected to "subtly" entice players into "rolling the dice", at which point the sunk-cost fallacy takes over. Lane described it as the latest in a series of monetization controversies for the developer.

In November 2024, the studio said they would streamline player rewards in an upcoming patch, describing the game's various progression tracks and currencies as "needlessly complex". The announcement caused widespread outrage. A viral Reddit post estimated that free-to-play players must play the game for over 800 hours to unlock a single champion. It was described by GamesRadar+ as the studio's "worst PR disaster in years". In mid-January 2025, game director Andrei van Room said they had "screwed up", explaining that a designer forgot to include the "first win of the day" experience bonus in their calculations, causing unintended consequences. The developer partially reverted some of the changes, including halving the cost of purchasing a champion, and the return of "hextech chests"—a loot box system introduced in 2016. These are purchasable virtual "chests" that provide random cosmetics, a practice that has been criticized as a form of gambling.

=== Plot ===
Before 2014, players existed in-universe as political leaders, or "Summoners", commanding champions to fight on the Fields of Justice—for example, Summoner's Rift—to avert a catastrophic war. Sociologist Matt Watson said the plot and setting were bereft of the political themes found in other role-playing games, and presented in reductive "good versus evil" terms. In the game's early development, Riot did not hire writers, and designers wrote character biographies only a paragraph long.

In September 2014, Riot Games rebooted the game's fictional setting, removing summoners from the game's lore to avoid "creative stagnation". Luke Plunkett wrote for Kotaku that, although the change would upset long-term fans, it was necessary as the game's player base grew in size. Shortly after the reboot, Riot hired Warhammer writer Graham McNeill. Riot's storytellers and artists create flavor text, adding "richness" to the game, but very little of this is seen as a part of normal gameplay. Instead, that work supplies a foundation for the franchise's expansion into other media, such as comic books and spin-off video games. The Fields of Justice were replaced by a new fictional setting—a planet called Runeterra. The setting has elements from several genres—from Lovecraftian horror to traditional sword and sorcery fantasy.

== Reception ==
Reception

Aggregate scores
| Aggregator | Score |
|---|---|
| Metacritic | 78/100 |
| OpenCritic | 90% recommend |

Review scores
| Publication | Score |
|---|---|
| 1Up.com | A− |
| Eurogamer | 8/10 |
| GameRevolution | B+ |
| GameSpot | 6/10 (2009); 9/10 (2013) |
| GameSpy | 4/5 |
| GamesRadar+ | 4/5 |
| GameZone | 9/10 |
| IGN | 8/10 (2009); 9.2/10 (2014) |
| PC Gamer (US) | 82/100 |

League of Legends received generally favorable reviews on its initial release, according to review aggregator website Metacritic. Fellow review aggregator OpenCritic assessed that the game received "mighty" approval, being recommended by 90% of critics. Many publications noted the game's high replay value. Kotaku reviewer Brian Crecente admired how items altered champion play styles. Quintin Smith of Eurogamer concurred, praising the amount of experimentation offered by champions. Comparing it to Defense of the Ancients, Rick McCormick of GamesRadar+ said that playing League of Legends was "a vote for choice over refinement".

Given the game's origins, other reviewers frequently compared aspects of it to DotA. According to GamesRadar+ and GameSpot, League of Legends would feel familiar to those who had already played DotA. The game's inventive character design and lively colors distinguished the game from its competitors. Smith concluded his review by noting that, although there was not "much room for negativity", Riot's goal of refining DotA had not yet been realized.

Although Crecente praised the game's free-to-play model, GameSpy's Ryan Scott was critical of the grind required for non-paying players to unlock key gameplay elements, calling it unacceptable in a competitive game. (Note: Scott's review referenced a now-retired system of in-game bonuses to champions which could be slowly earned while playing or purchased outright with real money.) Many outlets said the game was underdeveloped. A physical version of the game was available for purchase from retailers; GameSpot's Kevin VanOrd said it was an inadvisable purchase because the value included $10 of store credit for an unavailable store. German site GameStar noted that none of the bonuses in that version were available until the launch period had ended and refused to carry out a full review. IGN's Steve Butts compared the launch to the poor state of CrimeCraft's release earlier in 2009; he indicated that features available during League of Legends's beta were removed for the release, even for those who purchased the retail version. Matches took unnecessarily long to find for players, with long queue times, and GameRevolution mentioned frustrating bugs.

Some reviewers addressed toxicity in the game's early history. Crecente wrote that the community was "insular" and "whiny" when losing. Butts speculated that League of Legends inherited many of DotA's players, who had developed a reputation for being "notoriously hostile" to newcomers.

=== Reassessment ===
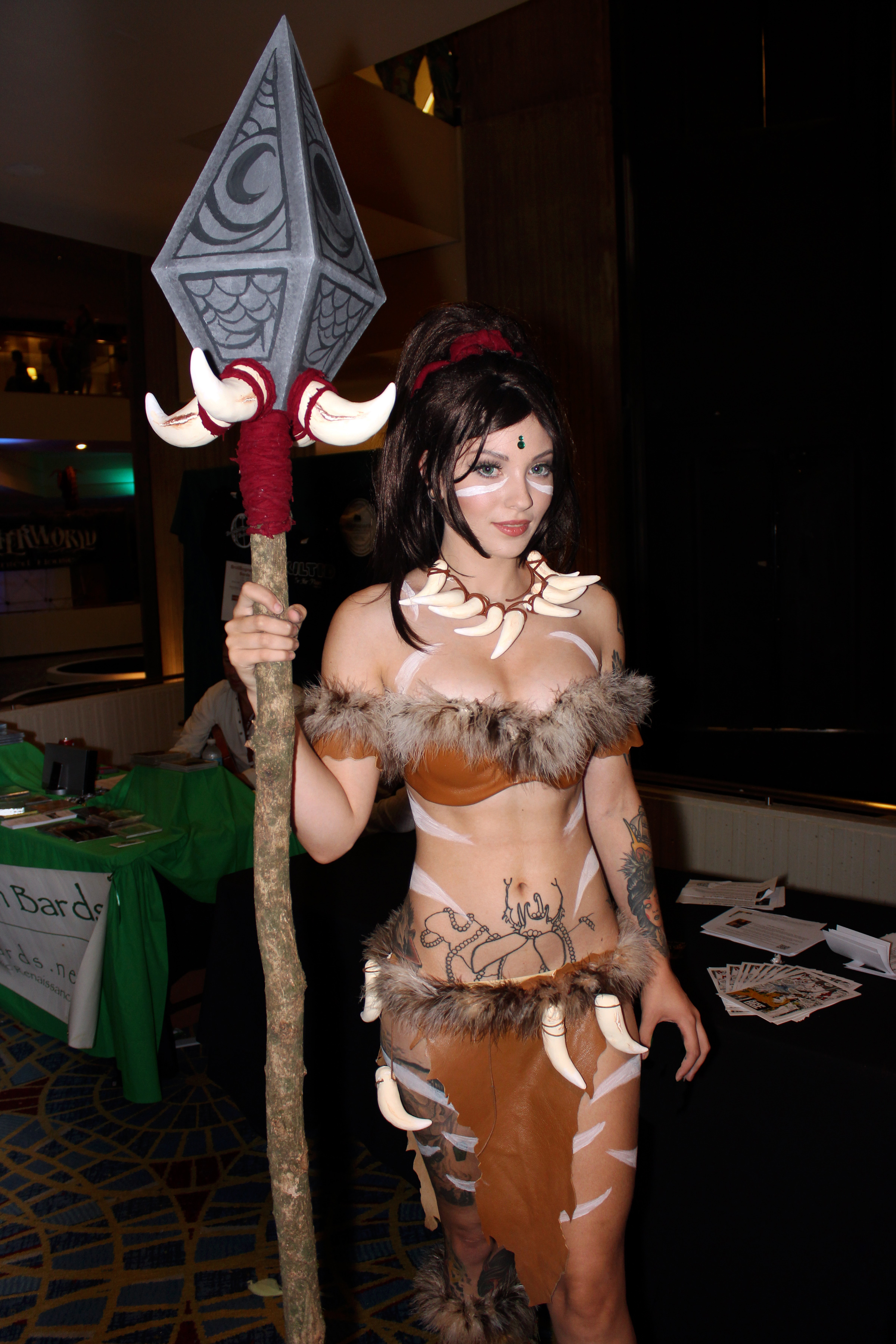
Fan cosplay of the League of Legends champion Nidalee

Regular updates to the game have resulted in a reappraisal by some outlets; IGN's second reviewer, Leah B. Jackson, explained that the website's original review had become "obsolete". Two publications increased their original scores: GameSpot from 6 to 9, and IGN from 8 to 9.2. The variety offered by the champion roster was described by Steven Strom of PC Gamer as "fascinating"; Jackson pointed to "memorable" characters and abilities. Although the items had originally been praised at release by other outlets such as Kotaku, Jackson's reassessment criticized the lack of item diversity and viability, noting that the items recommended to the player by the in-game shop were essentially required because of their strength.

While reviewers were pleased with the diverse array of play styles offered by champions and their abilities, Strom thought that the female characters still resembled those in "horny Clash of Clans clones" in 2018. Two years before Strom's review, a champion designer responded to criticism by players that a young, female champion was not conventionally attractive. He argued that limiting female champions to one body type was constraining and said progress had been made in Riot's recent releases.

Comparisons persisted between the game and others in the genre. GameSpot's Tyler Hicks wrote that new players would pick up League of Legends quicker than DotA and that the removal of randomness-based skills made the game more competitive. Jackson called League of Legends's rate of unlock for champions "a model of generosity", but less than DotA's sequel, Dota 2 (2013), produced by Valve, wherein characters are unlocked by default. Strom said the game was fast-paced compared to Dota 2's "yawning" matches, but slower than those of Blizzard Entertainment's "intentionally accessible" MOBA Heroes of the Storm (2015).

=== Accolades ===
At the first Game Developers Choice Awards in 2010, the game won four major awards: Best Online Technology, Game Design, New Online Game, and Visual Arts. At the 2011 Golden Joystick Awards, it won Best Free-to-Play Game. Music produced for the game won a Shorty Award, and was nominated at the Hollywood Music in Media Awards.

League of Legends has received awards for its contribution to esports. It was nominated for Best Esports Game at The Game Awards in 2017, 2018, 2025, and 2026; then won in 2019, 2020, and 2021. Specific events organized by Riot for esports tournaments have been recognized by awards ceremonies. Also at The Game Awards, the Riot won Best Esports Event for the 2019, 2020 and 2021 League World Championships. At the 39th Sports Emmy Awards in 2018, League of Legends won Outstanding Live Graphic Design for the 2017 world championship; as part of the pre-competition proceedings, Riot used augmented reality technology to have a computer-generated dragon fly across the stage.

== Player behavior ==
League of Legends's player base has a longstanding reputation for "toxicity"—rude and abusive in-game behavior, with a survey by the Anti-Defamation League indicating that 76% of players have experienced in-game harassment. Riot Games has acknowledged the problem and responded that only a small portion of the game's players are consistently toxic. According to Jeffrey Lin, Riot's lead designer of social systems, most bad behavior is committed by players "occasionally acting out". Several major systems have been implemented to tackle the issue. One is basic report functionality; players can report teammates or opponents who violate the game's code of ethics. The in-game chat is also monitored by algorithms that detect several types of abuse. An early system was the "Tribunal"—players who met certain requirements were able to review reports sent to Riot. If enough players determined that the messages were a violation, an automated system would punish them. Lin said that eliminating toxicity was an unrealistic goal, and the focus should be on rewarding good behavior. To that end, Riot reworked the "Honor system" in 2017, allowing players to award teammates virtual medals after games for one of three positive attributes. Acquiring these medals increases a player's "Honor level", rewarding them with free loot boxes over time.

== In esports ==
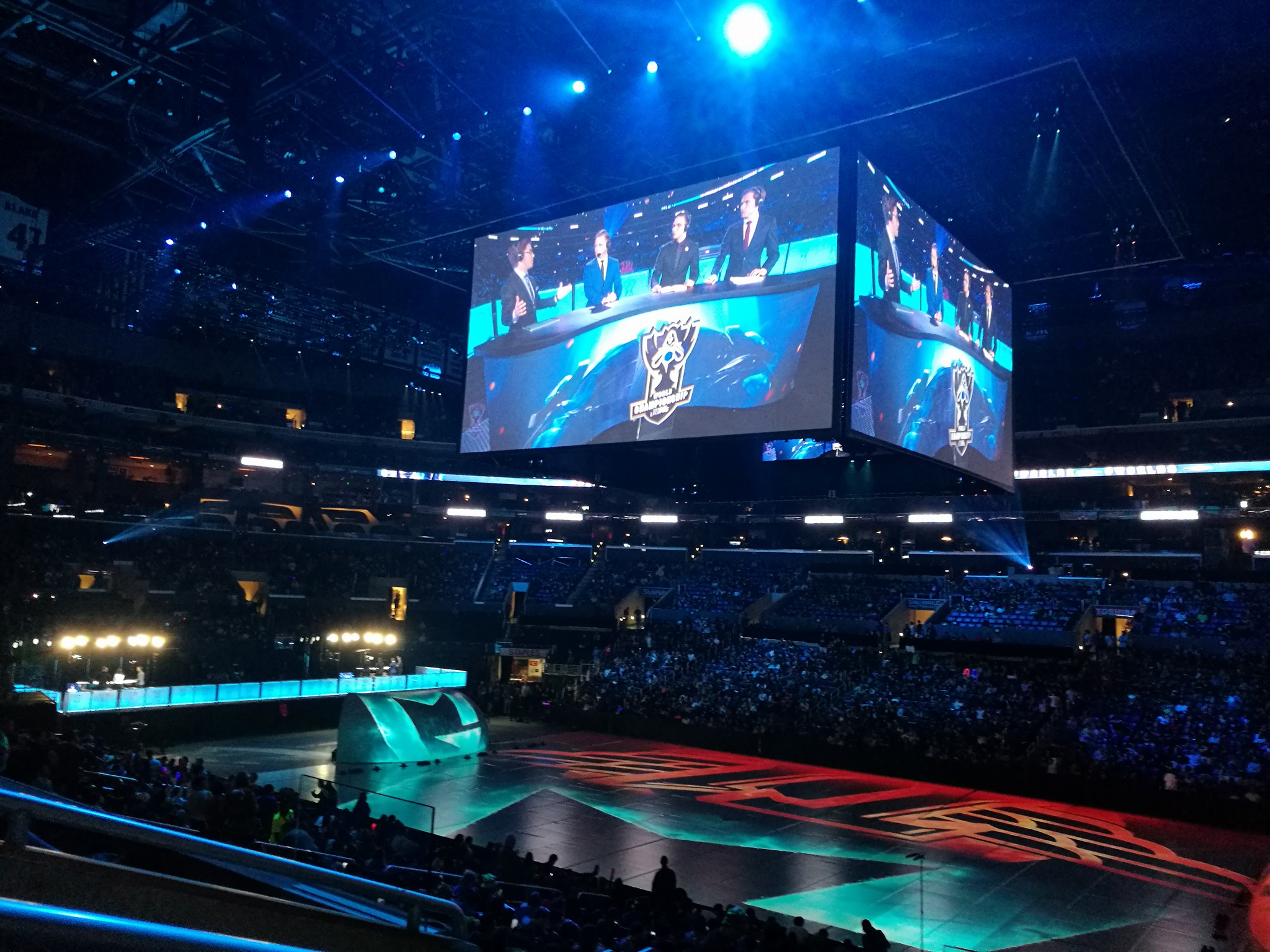
The 2016 League of Legends World Championship finals between SK Telecom T1 and Samsung Galaxy at the Staples Center

League of Legends is one of the world's largest esports, described by The New York Times as its "main attraction". Online viewership and in-person attendance for the game's esports events outperformed those of the National Basketball Association, the World Series, and the Stanley Cup in 2016. For the 2019 and 2020 League of Legends World Championship finals, Riot Games reported 44 and 45 peak million concurrent viewers respectively. Harvard Business Review said that League of Legends epitomized the birth of the esports industry.

As of April 2021, Riot Games operates 12 regional leagues internationally, four of which—China, Europe, Korea, and North America—have franchised systems. In 2017, this system comprised 109 teams and 545 players. League games are typically livestreamed on platforms such as Twitch and YouTube. The company sells streaming rights to the game; the North American league playoff is broadcast on cable television by sports network ESPN. In China, the rights to stream international events such as the World Championships and the Mid-Season Invitational were sold to Bilibili in Fall 2020 for a three-year deal reportedly worth US$113 million, while exclusive streaming rights for the domestic and other regional leagues are owned by Huya Live. The game's highest-paid professional players have commanded salaries of above $1 million—over three times the highest-paid players of Overwatch. The scene has attracted investment from businesspeople otherwise unassociated with esports, such as retired basketball player Rick Fox, who founded his own team. In 2020, his team's slot in the North American league was sold to the Evil Geniuses organization for $33 million.

== Spin-offs and other media ==
=== Games ===
For the 10th anniversary of League of Legends in 2019, Riot Games announced several games at various stages of production that were directly related to the League of Legends intellectual property (IP). A stand-alone version of Teamfight Tactics was announced for mobile operating systems iOS and Android at the event and released in March 2020. The game has cross-platform play with the Windows and macOS clients. Legends of Runeterra, a free-to-play digital collectible card game, launched in April 2020 for Microsoft Windows; the game features characters from League of Legends. League of Legends: Wild Rift is a version of the game for mobile operating systems Android and iOS. Instead of porting the game from League of Legends, Wild Rift's character models and environments were entirely rebuilt. A single-player, turn-based role-playing game, Ruined King: A League of Legends Story, was released in 2021 for PlayStation 4, PlayStation 5, Xbox One, Xbox Series X/S, Nintendo Switch, and Windows. It was the first title released under Riot Games's publishing arm, Riot Forge, wherein non-Riot studios develop games using League of Legends characters. In December 2020, Greg Street, vice-president of IP and Entertainment at Riot Games, announced that a massively multiplayer online role-playing game based on the game is in development. Song of Nunu: A League of Legends Story, a third-person adventure game revolving around the champion Nunu's search for his mother, with the help of the yeti Willump, was announced for a planned release in 2022. Developed by Tequila Works, the creators of Rime, Song of Nunu was released on Windows and the Nintendo Switch on November 1, 2023.

=== Music ===
Riot Games's first venture into music was in 2014 with the virtual heavy metal band Pentakill, promoting a skin line of the same name. Initially, Pentakill consisted of six champions: Kayle, Karthus, Mordekaiser, Olaf, Sona, and Yorick. In 2021, Viego was introduced to the group. Their music was primarily made by Riot Games's in-house music team but featured cameos by Mötley Crüe drummer Tommy Lee and Danny Lohner, a former member of industrial rock band Nine Inch Nails. Their second album, Grasp of the Undying, reached number one on the iTunes metal charts in 2017.

Pentakill was followed by K/DA, a virtual K-pop girl group composed of four champions, Ahri, Akali, Evelynn, and Kai'sa. As with Pentakill, K/DA is promotional material for a skin line by the same name. The group's debut single, "Pop/Stars", which premiered at the 2018 League of Legends World Championship, garnered over 400 million views on YouTube and sparked widespread interest from people unfamiliar with League of Legends. In 2020, Riot Games released All Out, the five-track EP from K/DA. A second EP, Firestarter, followed in 2026.

In 2019, Riot created a virtual hip hop group called True Damage, featuring the champions Akali, Yasuo, Qiyana, Senna, and Ekko. The vocalists—Keke Palmer, Thutmose, Becky G, Duckwrth, and Soyeon—performed a live version of the group's song, "Giants", during the opening ceremony of the 2019 League of Legends World Championship, alongside holographic versions of their characters. The in-game cosmetics promoted by the music video featured a collaboration with fashion house Louis Vuitton.

In 2023, Riot formed Heartsteel, a virtual boy band, comprising the champions Aphelios, Ezreal, Kayn, K'Sante, Sett, and Yone. The vocalists are Baekhyun from the K-pop groups Exo and SuperM, Cal Scruby, ØZI, and Tobi Lou. Heartsteel's debut single "Paranoia" was released in October of that year.

=== Comics ===
Riot announced a collaboration with Marvel Comics in 2018. Riot had previously experimented with releasing comics through its website. Shannon Liao of The Verge noted that the comic books were "a rare opportunity for Riot to showcase its years of lore that has often appeared as an afterthought". The first comic was League of Legends: Ashe—Warmother, which debuted in 2018, followed by League of Legends: Lux that same year. A print version of the latter was released in 2019.

=== Arcane ===
While celebrating League of Legends's tenth anniversary, Riot announced an animated television series, Arcane. It was the company's first production for television, and a collaboration between Riot Games and the French animation studio Fortiche. The series is set in the technologically advanced city of Piltover and its oppressed, underground sister city of Zaun. Arcane explores adult themes and is not intended for children. It features multiple playable characters from League of Legends. The voice cast includes Hailee Steinfeld as Vi, Ella Purnell as Jinx, Kevin Alejandro as Jayce, and Katie Leung as Caitlyn.

After a delay due to the COVID-19 pandemic, the series premiered in November 2021 on Netflix internationally and through Tencent Video in China. The first season received critical acclaim, winning four Emmy Awards and nine Annie Awards. After the success of the first season, Riot hired former executives from Netflix, HBO Max, and Paramount Television Studios to expand its entertainment division, and CEO Nicolo Laurent pledged to create an "entertainment company for the 21st century". Ahead of the premiere of the second and final season, Variety reported that production and marketing costs for Arcane's 18 episodes exceeded $250 million, making it the most expensive animated series ever made.

Bloomberg News reported that Riot paid Netflix around $3 million for each episode aired and that the studio failed to convert the series' success into in-game revenue. Riot had no plan to recoup the show's costs but said the second season was "on track to break even". The second season premiered in November 2024 to similar acclaim, winning seven Annie Awards in all nominated categories. GKIDS produced home media releases of the first season in 2024, including a collector's edition DVD, a 4K UHD steelbook, and Blu-ray variants. The collector's edition, 4K UHD, and 4K Blu-ray discs for the second season followed in 2025.
