= List of songs written and produced by Soyeon =

South Korean rapper, songwriter, and record producer

Jeon So-yeon, better known mononymously as Soyeon, is a South Korean rapper, singer, songwriter, producer, and leader of the girl group I-dle, formerly known as (G)I-dle, signed to Cube Entertainment. She is credited in the lyrics, music production and arrangement for most of I-dle's songs, and has written and produced songs for other artists as well. All song credits are adapted from the Korea Music Copyright Association's (KOMCA) database, unless otherwise noted. In June 2021, Soyeon was listed on KOMCA top 100 as the first fourth-generation girl group and third overall behind fourth-generation idol . She is also the youngest among female K-pop idols that are the most independent in the K-pop industry.

== Solo works ==
Year	Album	Artist(s)	Song	Lyrics		Music		Arrangement		Notes
Year	Album	Artist(s)	Song	Credited	With	Credited	With	Credited	With	Notes
2016	Unpretty Rapstar 3	Herself	"**She's Coming**"	Yes	Grace, Nada, Yuk Ji-dam, Janey, Giant Pink, Euna Kim, Miryo, Ha Ju-yeon	No	—N/a	No	—N/a	Unpretty Rapstar 3 Contestants: Grace; Nada; Miryo; Euna Kim; Yuk Ji-dam; Giant Pink; Jeon So-yeon; Janey; Kassy; Ha Ju-yeon
2016	Unpretty Rapstar 3	Herself	"Scary"	Yes	Nada	No	—N/a	No	—N/a	featuring Nada
2016	Unpretty Rapstar 3	Herself	"Children's Day"	Yes	Superbee	No	—N/a	No	—N/a	featuring Superbee
2016	Unpretty Rapstar 3	Herself	"Smile"	Yes	Davii	No	—N/a	No	—N/a	featuring Davii
2017	Digital single	Herself	"Jelly"	Yes	—	Yes	Yang Hai, Jung Kukyeong	Yes	Yang Hai, Jung Kukyeong	
2018	Digital single	Herself	"Idle Song"	Yes	—	Yes	Yang Hai, Jung Kukyeong	Yes	Yang Hai, Jung Kukyeong	
2018	ONE	Soyeon with United Cube	"Mermaid"	Yes	Lee Min-hyuk, Jung Il-hoon, Peniel Shin, Wooseok, Jang Ye-eun	No	—N/a	No	—N/a	A collaboration with other Cube artists for the company's 2018 United Cube Concert – One
2018	ONE	Soyeon with United Cube	"**Young & One**"	Yes	Hyuna, Seo Young-bae, Lee Min-hyuk, Peniel, BreadBeat, E'Dawn, Wooseok, Yuto, Jang Ye-eun, Kwon Eun-bin, Seo Jae-woo	No	—N/a	No	—N/a	A collaboration with other Cube artists for the company's 2018 United Cube Concert – One
2019	Non-digital single	Herself	"The Loveless"	Yes	—	Yes	—	Yes	HouDini	
2021	Deep	Hyoyeon featuring Soyeon and Loopy	"**Dessert**"	Yes	Lee Seu-ran, Loopy	Yes	Jonatan Gusmark, Ludvig Evers, Celine Helgemo, Tooji Sakutan, Hyoyeon, Loopy	No	—N/a	A collaboration
2021	—N/a	Herself	"Windy Burger"	Yes	—	Yes	JUN SIIXK	Yes	JUN SIIXK	The song released for Windy's concept teaser video.
2021	Windy	Herself	"**Beam Beam**"	Yes	—	Yes	Pop Time, Kako	Yes	Pop Time, Kako	
2021	Windy	Herself	"Weather"	Yes	—	Yes	Pop Time	Yes	Pop Time	
2021	Windy	Herself	"Quit"	Yes	—	Yes	Pop Time	Yes	Pop Time	
2021	Windy	Herself	"Psycho"	Yes	—	Yes	Pop Time, Kako	No	—N/a	
2021	Windy	Herself	"Is this bad b****** number?"	Yes	Bibi, Lee Young-ji	Yes	Kako, Flip_00	No	—N/a	featuring Bibi and Lee Young-ji
2021	Digital single	Colde featuring Soyeon	"**New Vision**"	Yes	Colde	No	—N/a	No	—N/a	
2021	Digital single	Ravi featuring Soyeon	"**Ani**"	Yes	RAVI	Yes	RAVI, Yuth, Clam	No	—N/a	
2022	Non-digital single	Herself	"**NANRINA**"(난리나)	No	—N/a	No	—N/a	Yes	Siik Jun	Remake
2022	Non-digital single	Herself	"**Shake Shack Korea"**(아따 맛있다)	Yes	—	No	—N/a	No	—N/a	Commercial song
2022	Digital single	Herself, Code Kunst, Woo Won-jae	**"The Ball Is Round"(공은 둥글어)**	Yes	Wonjae Woo	Yes	Code Kunst, Wonjae Woo	No	—N/a	
**Bold** denotes title track.

== (G)I-dle albums/singles ==
Year	Album	Song	Lyrics		Music		Arrangement	
Year	Album	Song	Credited	With	Credited	With	Credited	With
2018	I Am	"**Latata**"	Yes	—	Yes	Big Sancho	Yes	Big Sancho
2018	I Am	"$$$"	Yes	Le'mon	No	—N/a	No	—N/a
2018	I Am	"Maze"	Yes	Son Young-jin, Ferdy	No	—N/a	No	—N/a
2018	I Am	"Don't Text Me"	Yes	Big Sancho, Park Hae-il, Jerry Potter	No	—N/a	No	—N/a
2018	I Am	"What's in Your House?"	Yes	Arin, Vincenzo, Fuxxy, Any Masingga	No	—N/a	No	—N/a
2018	Digital single	"**Hann**" (한(一))	Yes	—	Yes	Yummy Tone	Yes	Yummy Tone
2019	I Made	"**Senorita**"	Yes	—	Yes	Big Sancho	Yes	Big Sancho
2019	I Made	"What's Your Name"	Yes	—	Yes	Lee Woo-min "collapsedone"	No	—N/a
2019	I Made	"Say No / Put it straight"	Yes	—	Yes	—	Yes	HouDini
2019	I Made	"Please / Give me your"	Yes	—	Yes	HouDini	Yes	HouDini
2019	I Made	"Blow Your Mind"	Yes	Minnie, FlowBlow	No	—N/a	No	—N/a
2019	Digital single	"**Uh-Oh**"	Yes	—	Yes	Jun, MooF (153/Joombas)	No	—N/a
2020	I Trust	"**Oh My God**"	Yes	—	Yes	Big Sancho	Yes	Big Sancho
2020	I Trust	"Luv U" (사랑해)	Yes	—	Yes	Big Sancho	Yes	Big Sancho
2020	I Trust	"Maybe"	Yes	—	Yes	Min Lee "collapsedone"	No	—N/a
2020	Dumdi Dumdi	"I'm the Trend"	Yes	Minnie, Yuqi, FCMHoudini	No	—N/a	No	—N/a
2020	Dumdi Dumdi	"**Dumdi Dumdi**"	Yes	—	Yes	Pop Time	Yes	Pop Time
2020	Oh My God	"Tung-Tung (Empty)"	Yes	Kim Ye-kwang, Minnie, Mio Jourakuji	No	—N/a	No	—N/a
2021	I Burn	"Hann(Alone in winter" (한(寒); Han(Cold)	Yes	Ahn Ye-eun	Yes	Ahn Ye-eun	Yes	BreadBeat, Ahn Ye-eun
2021	I Burn	"**Hwaa**" (화(火花); Anger(Spark))	Yes	—	Yes	Pop Time	Yes	Pop Time
2021	I Burn	"Moon"	Yes	—	No	Minnie, FCMHoudini	No	—N/a
2021	I Burn	"Where Is Love"	Yes	—	Yes	Lee Woo-min "collapsedone"	No	—N/a
2021	I Burn	"Lost"	Yes	Yuqi, Seo Jae-woo	No	—N/a	No	—N/a
2021	I Burn	"Dahlia"	Yes	Minnie, BreadBeat	No	—N/a	No	—N/a
2022	I Never Die	"**Tomboy**"	Yes	—	Yes	Pop Time, Jenci	Yes	Pop Time, Jenci
2022	I Never Die	"Never Stop Me" (말리지 마)	Yes	—	Yes	Kako, Pop Time	Yes	Pop Time, Kako
2022	I Never Die	"Villain Dies"	Yes	—	Yes	The Proof	No	—N/a
2022	I Never Die	"Already"	Yes	Minnie, Houdini	No	—N/a	No	—N/a
2022	I Never Die	"Escape"	Yes	Minnie, BreadBeat	No	—N/a	No	—N/a
2022	I Never Die	"Liar"	Yes	Yuqi, Siixk Jun	No	—N/a	No	—N/a
2022	I Never Die	"My Bag"	Yes	—	Yes	Nathan	No	—N/a
2022	I Love	"**Nxde**"	Yes	—	Yes	Pop Time, Kako	Yes	Pop Time, Kako
2022	I Love	"Love"	Yes	—	Yes	Big Sancho	Yes	Big Sancho
2022	I Love	"Change"	Yes	Minnie	No	—N/a	No	—N/a
2022	I Love	"Reset"	Yes	–	No	—N/a	No	—N/a
2022	I Love	"Sculpture"	Yes	HOUDINI (후디니), Minnie	No	—N/a	No	—N/a
2022	I Love	"Dark (X-File)"	Yes	—	No	—N/a	No	—N/a
2023	I Feel	"**Queencard**"	Yes	—	Yes	Pop Time, Daily, Likey	Yes	Pop Time, Daily, Likey
2023	I Feel	"Allergy"	Yes	—	Yes	Pop Time, Daily, Likey	Yes	Pop Time, Daily, Likey
2023	I Feel	"Lucid"	Yes	Minnie	No	—N/a	No	—N/a
2023	I Feel	"Paradise"	Yes	B.O, Minnie	No	—N/a	No	—N/a
2023	I Feel	"Peter Pan" (어린 어른)	Yes	Yuqi	No	—N/a	No	—N/a
2024	2	"**Super Lady**"	Yes	—	Yes	Pop Time, Daily, Likey	Yes	Pop Time, Daily, Likey
2024	2	"Revenge"	Yes	—	Yes	Pop Time, Kako	Yes	Pop Time, Kako
2024	2	"Fate" (나는 아폰 건 딱 질색이니까)	Yes	—	Yes	Pop Time, Daily, Likey	Yes	Pop Time, Daily, Likey
2024	2	"Wife"	Yes	—	Yes	Daily, Likey, Pop Time	Yes	Daily, Likey, Pop Time
2024	I Sway	"**Klaxon**"	Yes	—	Yes	Pop Time, Daily, Yoon Ra-kyung	Yes	Pop Time, Daily, Yoon Ra-kyung
**Bold** denotes title track.

== (G)I-dle's other works ==
Year	Album	Song	Lyrics		Music		Arrangement	
Year	Album	Song	Credited	With	Credited	With	Credited	With
2019	Her Private Life OST	"Help Me"	Yes	Lim Hyun-jun	No	—N/a	No	—N/a
2019	Fan-dora's Box Part 1	"Put It Straight" (Nightmare Version) (싫다고 말해)	Yes	—	Yes	HouDini	Yes	June (쥰)
2019	Queendom; Final Comeback Single	"Lion"	Yes	—	Yes	Big Sancho (Yummy Tone)	Yes	Big Sancho (Yummy Tone)
2021	Digital single	"Last Dance"	Yes	Kriz	Yes	GroovyRoom	No	—N/a

== I-dle albums/singles ==
Year	Album	Song	Lyrics		Music		Arrangement	
Year	Album	Song	Credited	With	Credited	With	Credited	With
2025	We Are	"**Good Thing**"	Yes	—	Yes	Pop Time, Daily, Likey	Yes	Pop Time, Daily, Likey
2025	We Are	"Girlfriend"	Yes	—	Yes	Pop Time, Daily, Likey	Yes	Pop Time, Daily, Likey
2026	We Made	"**Mono**"	Yes	Shannon Bae, Tyler Brooks	Yes	Pop Time, Daily, Shannon Bae, Likey, Kameron Glasper	No	—N/a
2026	We Made	"**Gimme Dat Love**"	Yes	Shannon Bae, Alyx, Samantha Maria Camara	No	—N/a	No	—N/a
2026	We Made	"Crow"	Yes	—	No	—N/a	No	—N/a
**Bold** denotes title track.

== Other artists ==
Year	Artist(s)	Song	Album	Lyrics		Music		Arrangement	
Year	Artist(s)	Song	Album	Credited	With	Credited	With	Credited	With
2017	JBJ	"Say My Name"	Fantasy	Yes	FlowBlow, Kim Sang-gyun	No	—N/a	No	—N/a
2019	Lee Min-hyuk	"You Too? Me Too!"	Hutazone	Yes	Lee Min-hyuk	No	—N/a	No	—N/a
2019	CLC	"**No**"	No.1	Yes	Yeeun	Yes	Jun	Yes	Jun
2019	Key	"**I Wanna Be**"	Face	Yes	Park Sung-hee	No	—N/a	No	—N/a
2019	Park Bom	"HANN (Alone)"	Queendom Part 1	Yes	Cheetah	Yes	Yummy Tone	No	—N/a
2020	Namjoo	"**Bird**"	Bird	Yes	—	Yes	Big Sancho (Yummy Tone)	Yes	Big Sancho (Yummy Tone)
2021	Lee Seo-bin	"**Eternal Sunshine**"	CAP-TEEN TOP7	Yes	—	Yes	FCMHoudini	No	—N/a
2023	Fantasy Boys	"**Spaceman**"	Fantasy Boys- Semi Final	Yes	Soul, Yukyung Ko (JamFactory), Sohee Kwon (JamFactory)	No	—N/a	No	—N/a
2024	QWER	"**My Name Is Malguem**"	Algorithm's Blossom	Yes	—	Yes	Pop Time, Daily, Likey	Yes	Pop Time, Daily, Likey
2025	Baby Dont Cry	"**F Girl**"	F Girl	Yes	—	Yes	Pop Time, Daily, Likey	No	—N/a
2025	Baby Dont Cry	"Bet You'll Regret It"	F Girl	Yes	—	Yes	Pop Time, Daily, Likey	No	—N/a
**Bold** denotes title track.

== Other works ==
Year	Artist(s)	Song	Album	Lyrics		Music		Arrangement	
Year	Artist(s)	Song	Album	Credited	With	Credited	With	Credited	With
2018	Idol Room	"Theme Song 2"	—N/a	Yes	—	Yes	—	Yes	—
2018	Seulgi, Soyeon, Chung-ha, SinB	"Wow Thing"	SM Station X 0	Yes	Cho Yun-kyoung, Karen Poole, Anne Judith Stokke Wik, Sonny J Mason	No	—N/a	No	—N/a
2019	Radio Star	"Logo song"	—N/a	Yes	—	Yes	—	Yes	—
2024	Jennifer Lopez featuring (G)I-dle	"This Time Around"	This Is Me... Now	Yes	Isran, Jennifer Lopez, Jason Desrouleaux, Atia Boggs, Douglas Ford, Roget Chahayed, Angel Lopez, Jeff Gitelman, Brytavious Chambers, Federico Vindver	Yes	Isran, J. Lopez, Gitelman, Boggs, Ford, Desrouleaux, Chahayed, A. Lopez, Chambers, Vindver	No	—N/a
