= Her (EP) =

- Digital cover

EP by Minnie
- Released: January 21, 2025
- Length: 22:29
- Languages: English; Korean
- Label: Cube

Minnie chronology
Her (2025)	I Love You to the Moon and Back (2026)

Singles from Her
- 1. "Blind Eyes Red" Released: January 7, 2025; 2. "Her" Released: January 21, 2025

Her (stylized in all caps) is the debut extended play (EP) by Thai singer and I-dle member Minnie. It was released by Cube Entertainment on January 21, 2025. The EP comprises seven tracks, including the pre-release single "Blind Eyes Red" and the lead single of the same name.

== Background and release ==
On December 3, 2024, it was reported that Minnie would be making her solo debut with an album releasing in January 2025, making her the fourth member of her group to do so, following Soyeon, Yuqi, and Miyeon. A pre-release single for the upcoming debut album, "Blind Eyes Red", was released on January 7. On January 8, Cube announced that her first extended play, Her, will be released on January 21. On January 9, the promotional schedule was released, followed by the track listing a day later, with "Her" announced as the EP's lead single, along with the tracks "Drive U Crazy" and "Obsession", which will feature bandmate Yuqi and WayV's Ten, respectively. Her was released on January 21, along with its lead single of the same name.

== Theme and lyrics ==
"Her is about how when I look at myself, or when the public looks at me, they think of me in a certain way, but actually there could be different sides inside. There's a different self from what you see on the outside. I think all these different sides are Minnie, and I want to show them all."

— Minnie, discussing the theme of the EP

Her features seven tracks, all of which were written and composed with Minnie's assistance. Minnie describes the EP as having "diverse genres like funk, ballad, R&B and different colors like dreamy, vivid, kitschy and emotional"

The first track and the EP's title track, "Her", conveys the idea that she is her own source of inspiration, and expressing how she feels about herself both in and out of the spotlight. The last three tracks—"Valentine's Dream", "It's Okay", and "Obsession"—were written four to five years prior to the EP release, and contain lyrics that recount Minnie's personal experiences.

== Track listing ==
Her track listing
No.	Title	Lyrics	Music	Arrangement	Length
1.	"Blind Eyes Red"	Minnie; Tim Tan	BreadBeat; Ca$hcow; Tim Tan	BreadBeat; Ca$hcow	3:23
2.	"Her"	Minnie; Big Naughty; Charlotte; Tim Tan	Minnie; BreadBeat; Shin Kung; Ca$hcow; Tim Tan	BreadBeat; Shin Kung; Ca$hcow	2:39
3.	"Drive U Crazy" (featuring Yuqi of (G)I-dle)	Minnie; Bård Bonsaksen; Hilda Stenmalm	BreadBeat; Shin Kung; Tim Tan; Bonsaksen; Stenmalm	BreadBeat; Shin Kung; Tim Tan	2:37
4.	"Cherry Sky"	Minnie; Chloe Angelides; Liza Owen	Minnie; Dallas K; Angelides; Owen	Dallas K; Angelides; Owen	2:55
5.	"Valentine's Dream"	Minnie; Houdini	Minnie; Houdini; BreadBeat; Shin Kung	BreadBeat; Shin Kung; Houdini	3:21
6.	"It's Okay"	Minnie; Houdini	Minnie; Houdini; BreadBeat; Ca$hcow	BreadBeat; Ca$hcow; Houdini	3:48
7.	"Obsession" (featuring Ten of WayV)	Minnie; Tim Tan; Tytan	Minnie; Houdini; Coolcat; BreadBeat; Tim Tan	BreadBeat; Houdini	3:42
Total length:					22:29

== Charts ==
=== Weekly charts ===
Weekly chart performance for Her
Chart (2025)	Peak position
Japanese Albums (Oricon)	46
South Korean Albums (Circle)	2
US Top Current Album Sales (Billboard)	32

=== Monthly charts ===
Monthly chart performance for Her
Chart (2025)	Position
South Korean Albums (Circle)	5

=== Year-end charts ===
Year-end chart performance for Her
Chart (2025)	Position
South Korean Albums (Circle)	89

== Release history ==
Release history for Her
Region	Date	Format	Label
Various	January 21, 2025	Digital download; streaming	Cube
South Korea	January 22, 2025	CD; vinyl LP	Cube
United States	February 28, 2025	CD	Cube; Universal Music
