= Minnie (singer) =

Thai singer (born 1997)

- มินนี่
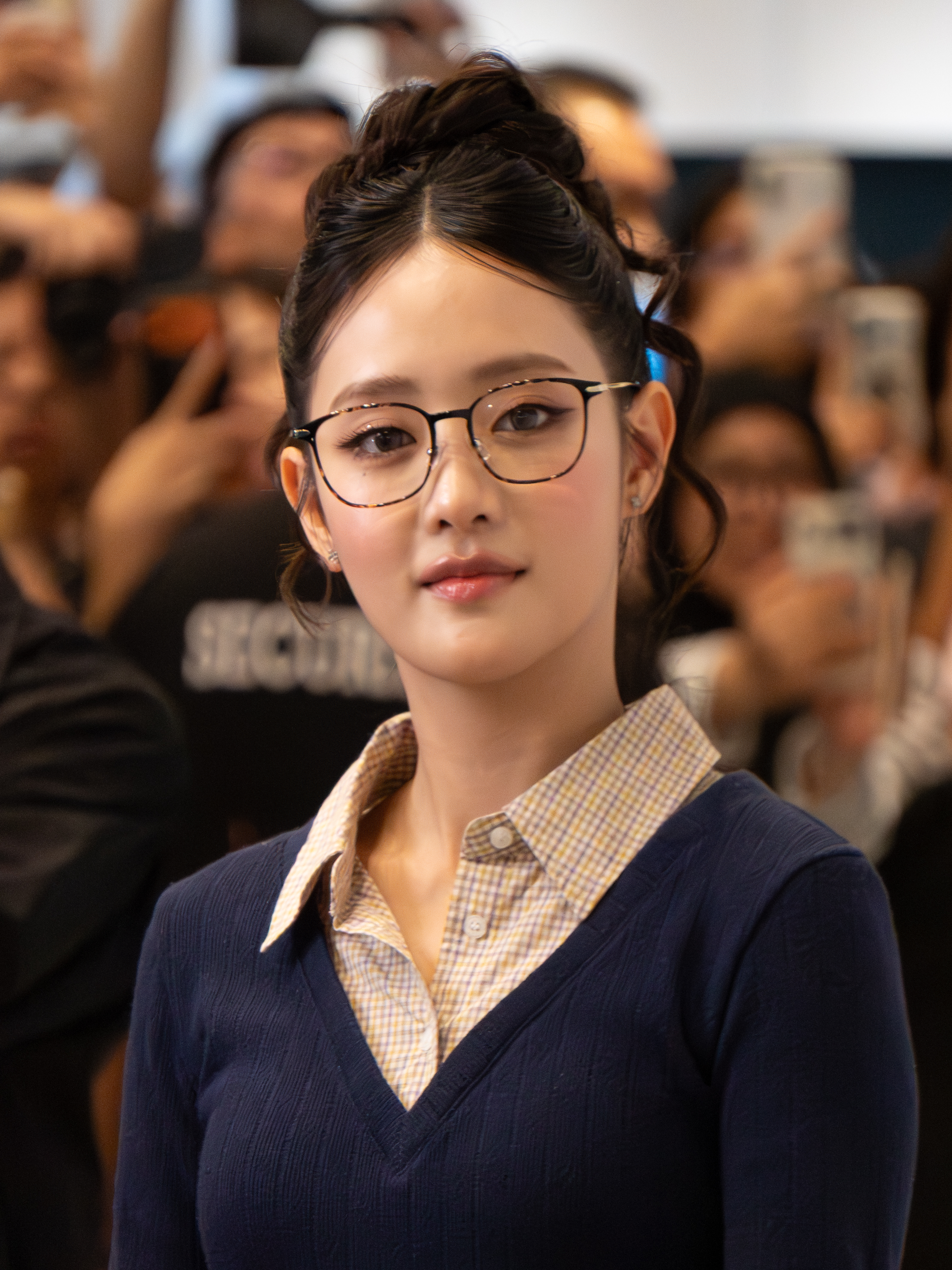
- Minnie in 2026
- Born: Nicha Yontararak; October 23, 1997 (age 29); Bangkok, Thailand
- Education: Wattana Wittaya Academy
- Occupations: Singer; songwriter; actress
- Years active: 2016–present
- Relatives: Nat Yontararak (uncle)
- Musical career
- Origin: South Korea
- Genres: K-pop; R&B; Thai pop
- Instrument: Vocals
- Label: Cube
- Member of: I-dle; United Cube

Korean name
- Hangul: 민니
- RR: Minni
- MR: Minni

Nicha Yontararak (Thai: ณิชา ยนตรรักษ์; born October 23, 1997), known professionally as Minnie (Korean: 민니; Thai: มินนี่), is a Thai singer and actress based in South Korea. She is a member of South Korean girl group I-dle, which debuted as (G)I-dle on May 2, 2018, under Cube Entertainment. Minnie made her solo debut with the extended play Her on January 21, 2025.

== Early life and education ==
Minnie was born on October 23, 1997, in Bangkok, Thailand and is a third-generation Thai Chinese. She has older twin brothers. She grew up in a musical family where her mother, aunt and uncle play the piano. Minnie has been playing piano since she was four and taking vocal lessons since she was six years old. Her mother was her main influence for loving music. She always watched her mom playing the piano, and learned to play it from her. Minnie attended Wattana Wittaya Academy and studied music at Grammy Vocal Studio in Thailand. She was a cheerleader, drummer, actress in a stage play, and more in her school. She also studied Chinese for four years. Minnie is multilingual. She speaks five languages including Thai, English, Korean, Japanese, and Mandarin.

== Career ==
=== 2014–2017: Pre-debut activities ===
In September 2014, she participated in the Cube Star World Audition in Thailand and came to South Korea in 2015 after her mother encouraged her, calling it a "once in a life opportunity".

On March 23, 2016, Minnie was revealed to the public through Cube Entertainment's official Instagram. On November 5, she was featured in Jeon So-yeon's performance stage at Unpretty Rapstar 3 concert.

In June 2017, she participated in a promotional video for Rising Star Cosmetics along with Song Yuqi and Shuhua, future members of (G)I-dle. The same year, Minnie was given an opportunity to feature for Line Friends' "Twinkle Twinkle Little Star" and six songs in Dance Party! – Children's English Songs.

=== 2018–2019: Debut with (G)I-dle and collaborations ===
On May 2, 2018, Minnie debuted with (G)I-dle with their first extended play (EP) I Am and the lead single "Latata". She received positive reviews for having a unique, attractive, and soothing voice.

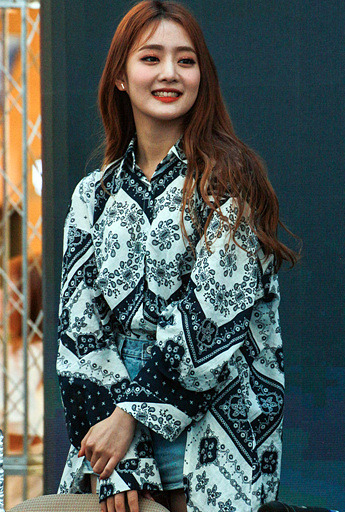
Minnie at a fan sign during "Latata" promotions in 2018.

In their second EP, I Made, Minnie participated in composing, songwriting, and arranging "Blow Your Mind" which was first released through To Neverland. A self-directed music video was released. Minnie confessed that she makes songs on piano and is taking MIDI classes to improve composing. She was credited in composing "For You" for (G)I-dle's debut Japanese EP, Latata. In October 2019, (G)I-dle took part in Queendom by Mnet. In the first preliminary stage, the viewers were overwhelmed with Minnie's Thai intro enchantment for "Latata", and was well received from viewers in South Korea and Thailand. In the third pre-contest unit stage, Minnie represents (G)I-dle's vocal member. She shared the stage with AOA's Hyejeong performing "Instagram" by Dean. The stage was voted the most anticipated unit stage by the contestants. Moreover, the song re-entered music charts and grew popularity amongst the general public due to their performance. On October 15, it was announced that Minnie teamed up with Wengie, a Chinese Australian YouTuber for a collaboration song "Empire" on October 18. "Empire" debuted at number 22 on the Billboard World Digital Songs.

=== 2020–2024: Acting debut and solo activities ===
In 2020, Minnie participated in writing and composing "I'm the Trend" and "Tung-Tung (Empty)" alongside FCM Houdini. "I'm the Trend" is a song dedicated for (G)I-dle's fanbase, Neverland, and was unveiled during her group's first online concert I-Land: Who Am I on July 5, 2020. "Tung-Tung (Empty)" is an emotional song that expresses the feeling of a tired heart which was once full but became empty. Through Minnie's words, "I hope that many people will sympathize with this song because it conveys loneliness". The song was released on (G)I-dle's second Japanese second EP Oh My God.

In September, Minnie made her acting debut in a Netflix's sitcom So Not Worth It alongside Park Se-wan, Shin Hyun Seung, Got7's Youngjae and Han Hyun-min. The show centers on multinational students living their lives together in a dorm in Seoul. Minnie plays a fictionalized version of herself, a genre savvy Thai girl who loves Korean dramas.

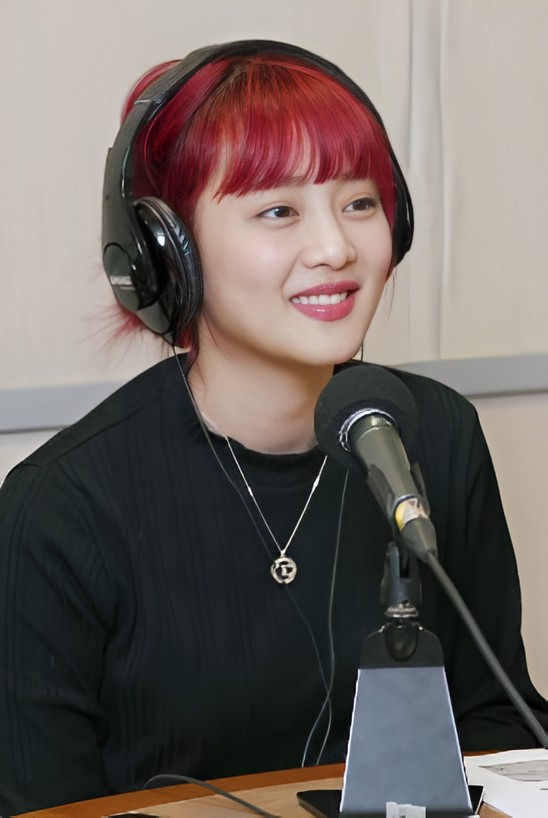
Minnie in 2021

In October, Minnie sung "Getaway" as part of My Dangerous Wife soundtrack and "We Already Fell In Love" together with Miyeon as part of Do Do Sol Sol La La Sol soundtrack On October 6, Glance TV introduced their new fashion show Minnie Soojin's i'M THE TREND (민니 수진의 i'M THE TREND) and paired Minnie and Soojin together. The duo had a styling battle every time for the title of "Trend Center", which is a combination of a trend setter and an idol center. In addition, the duo revealed their styling secrets, various outfits, shopping tips and video pictorial "Fashion Film". The show premiered on October 14 through Naver Style TV. On November 22, Minnie appeared on Play Seoul, a program produced by the Seoul Tourism Foundation and KBS where influential K-stars can share with global fans their experiences in Seoul in real-time. The show aims to promote safe post-COVID-19 tourism in Seoul. Minnie alongside Yuqi introduced the hip alley ways in Seoul by visiting Euljiro and Itaewon for their cafes and restaurants.

In 2021, Minnie co-composed "Moon" and "Dahlia", which was released on January 11 for her group's fourth EP I Burn. On September 23, the singer featured in "Money Honey", a collaboration song with Thai rappers F. Hero and UrboyTJ. The song features lyrics about love that can't be exchanged with money or any other materials. It was released as a digital single on music streaming app Joox.

=== 2025–present: Solo debut with Her and I Love You to the Moon and Back ===
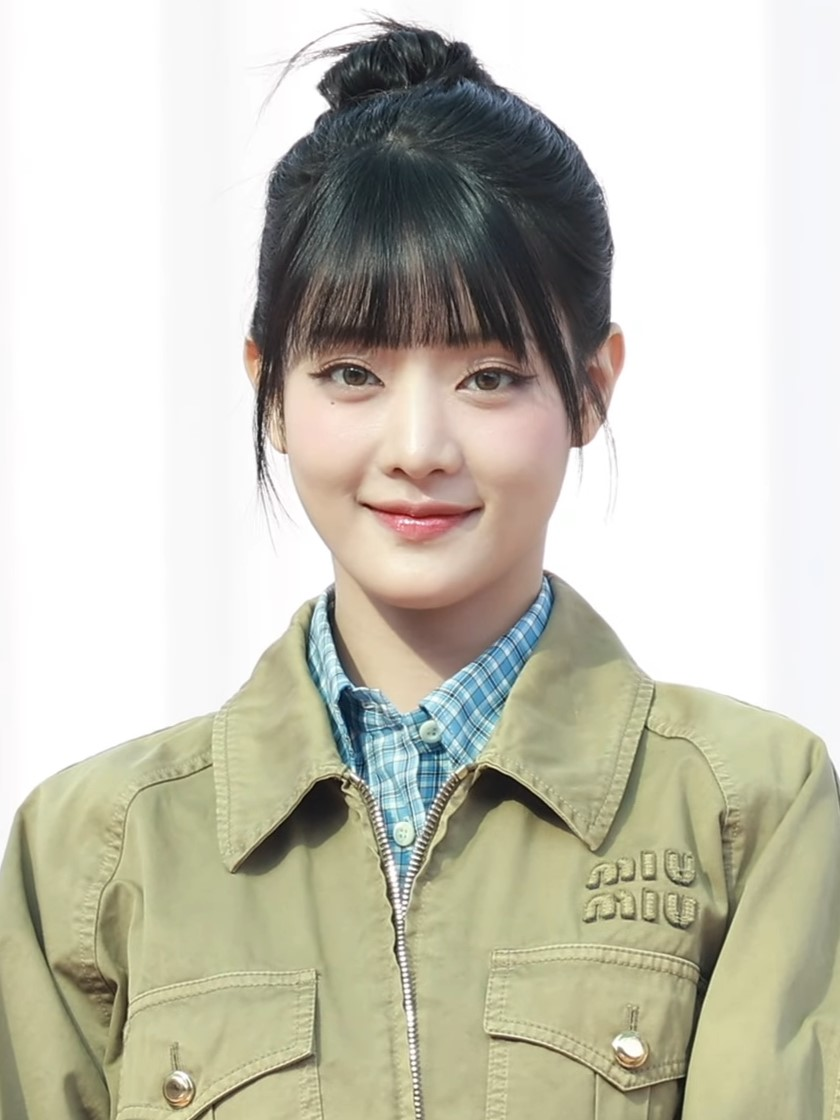
Minnie in 2025

On December 3, 2024, it was reported that Minnie would be making her solo debut with an album releasing in January 2025. Minnie released her debut EP Her and its lead single of the same name on January 21, which was preceded by its pre-release single "Blind Eyes Red" on January 7. On October 23, 2026, Minnie released her first Thai-language EP I Love You to the Moon and Back.

== Other ventures ==
=== Endorsements ===
Before Minnie's debut, she became a model for the local skin care line Celeb's Secret (Korean: 셀럽시크릿) alongside bandmates Yuqi and Shuhua. In July 2022, Webtoon Thailand selected Minnie as their model to promote their new campaign, where Minnie picked three new stories to promote. It was later reported that the three titles were ranked at the top of the platform, and had the highest sales revenue at the time, as well as reaching over 50 million views of the video of the campaign in the span of seven days. On the same month, Minnie was announced as MAC's new muse. In August 2022, Minnie was announced as the muse for the South Korean clothing brand Laura Laura (Korean: 로라로라). In September 2022, clothing brand ACBF selected Minnie alongside band member Yuqi as their new models. In November 2022, Minnie was announced as mode for the Italian clothing brand Duvetica. In December of the same year, Minnie was one of the celebrities who advertised for the South Korean traveling platform How About Here (Korean: 여기어때) and its partner at the time, Melon. Followed with her advertisement for the South Korean cosmetics brand 3CE. In February 2023, she became the muse for the South Korean brand J.Estina handbag alongside bandmate Miyeon. In August of the same year, she was selected as the new ambassador for Prada's Italian fashion brand Miu Miu. In 2026, she became Ownday's new ambassador.

Minnie landed her first solo magazine cover for L'Officiel Muse's Thailand June 2021 edition. Since then she has been on the cover of Sudsapda, VogueMore Thailand, Harper's BAZAAR Thailand, and Elle Thailand. She also appeared in an advertisement for Nespresso and Chiara Ferragni's limited edition coffee drink.

=== Philanthropy ===
In February 2023, Minnie donated 20 million won to help in the 2023 Turkey–Syria earthquake through Hope Bridge National Disaster Relief Association.

== Artistry ==
=== Musical style and songwriting ===
Journalist Jake Lau of South China Morning Post noted that Minnie has a versatile voice: "she sings in a soft, breathy voice when performing more emotive songs and acoustic renditions, but on more powerful songs such as Lion, Minnie can belt out the powerful high notes". Apart from her voice, she is also known for her striking eyes and strong gaze that is featured in many of (G)I-dle's music videos. Through an interview with HelloAsia, she revealed that she gets inspired by her own story or from other people's stories or movies.

=== Influences ===
Growing up in a family of musicians, Minnie stated that the music video of "A Thousand Miles" by Vanessa Carlton where she starts playing the song while the piano was moving, ignited her dreams as a musician. She commented, "Ever since I saw that MV, I started thinking that I will sing and play the piano. I must become an artist like that". She also cites Super Junior whose songs she often sang to while growing up that led her into K-Pop. Through a magazine interview, Minnie considered American singer Alicia Keys as her role model since her childhood. She explained that she used to watch a lot of television with her mother when she was a child, and the performance by Keys' 2003 hit "If I Ain't Got You" was what inspired her to pursue music. She also cited Australian singer Troye Sivan, Thai singer Stamp Apiwat, and American singer Charlotte Lawrence as her inspirations and hopes to collaborate with them someday.

== Discography ==
=== Extended plays ===
Title	Details	Peak chart positions		Sales
Title	Details	KOR	JPN	Sales
Her	Released: January 21, 2025; Label: Cube Entertainment; Formats: CD, LP, digital download, streaming	2	46	KOR: 245,713; JPN: 893 (phy.)
I Love You to the Moon and Back	Released: October 23, 2026; Label: Cube Entertainment; Formats: Digital download, streaming; Track listing: 1. "To the Moon :)"; 2. "Insomnia"; 3. "White Clouds" (เมฆขาว)	—	—	—N/a
"—" denotes items that did not chart or were not released in that region.

=== Singles ===
==== As lead artist ====
Title	Year	Peak chart positions	Album
Title	Year	KOR	Album
"Expectations" (with Anne-Marie)	2023	55	Unhealthy (Deluxe)
"Blind Eyes Red"	2025	— (Note: "Blind Eyes Red" did not enter the Circle Digital Chart, but it peaked at number 43 on the component Circle Download Chart.)	Her
"Her"	2025	122	Her
"To the Moon :)"	2026	—	I Love You to the Moon and Back
"—" denotes items that did not chart or were not released in that region.

==== As featured artist ====
Title	Year	Peak chart positions		Album
Title	Year	KOR	US World	Album
"Empire" (Wengie feat. Minnie)	2019	—	22	Empire
"Money Honey" (F. Hero and UrboyTJ feat. Minnie)	2021	—	—	Non-album single
"Thief" (Heize feat. Minnie)	2022	199	—	Undo
"Not OK" (Loco feat. Minnie)	2023	195	—	Weak
"Blue" (Yung Kai feat. Minnie)	2025	—	—	Non-album single
"—" denotes items that did not chart or were not released in that region.

=== Soundtrack appearances ===
Title	Year	Peak chart positions	Album
Title	Year	KOR	Album
"Getaway"	2020	—	My Dangerous Wife OST
"We Already Fell in Love" (with Miyeon)	2020	—	Do Do Sol Sol La La Sol OST
"Saying Hello"	2022	— (Note: "Saying Hello" did not enter the Gaon Digital Chart, but debuted and peaked at number 80 on the Gaon Download Chart.)	Link: Eat, Love, Kill OST
"In the Novel"	2022	—	It Was All a Mistake OST
"Timing"	2023	— (Note: "Timing" did not enter the Circle Digital Chart, but debuted and peaked at number 91 on the component Circle Download Chart.)	A Good Day to Be a Dog OST
"Like a Dream" (꿈결같아서)	2024	65	Lovely Runner OST
"Answer"	2025	— (Note: "Answer" did not enter the Circle Digital Chart, but peaked at number 40 on the component Circle Download Chart.)	Love Scout OST
"Draw the Moon" (달이 그려지다) (feat. Miyavi)	2025	— (Note: "Draw the Moon" did not enter the Circle Digital Chart, but debuted and peaked at number 157 on the component Circle Download Chart.)	Myst, Might, Mayhem OST
"Breath" (숨)	2025	— (Note: "Breath" did not enter the Circle Digital Chart, but peaked at number 45 on the component Circle Download Chart.)	Resident Playbook OST
"Burn Me into the Light" (with Shuhua)	2025	—	The Resurrected OST
"Devil's Angel"	2025	— (Note: "Devil's Angel" did not enter the Circle Digital Chart, but debuted and peaked at number 73 on the component Circle Download Chart.)	Dear X OST
"Hello"	2026	— (Note: "Hello" did not enter the Circle Digital Chart, but debuted and peaked at number 81 on the component Circle Download Chart.)	Siren's Kiss OST
"End+ing"	2026	— (Note: "End+ing" did not enter the Circle Digital Chart, but debuted and peaked at number 51 on the component Circle Download Chart.)	Spooky in Love OST
"—" denotes items that did not chart or were not released in that region.

=== Promotional songs ===
Title	Year	Album	Notes
"Hot Summer" (Line Friends feat. Minnie)	2017	Dance Party! – Children's English Songs	Promotional songs with Line Friends
"Morning Sunrise" (Line Friends feat. Minnie)	2017	Dance Party! – Children's English Songs	Promotional songs with Line Friends
"Dinosaur Song (Herbivore Ver.)" (Line Friends feat. Minnie)	2017	Dance Party! – Children's English Songs	Promotional songs with Line Friends
"The Brush Brush Song" (Line Friends feat. Minnie)	2017	Dance Party! – Children's English Songs	Promotional songs with Line Friends
"Oats, Peas, Beans and Barley Grow" (Line Friends feat. Minnie)	2017	Dance Party! – Children's English Songs	Promotional songs with Line Friends
"Clap Concert" (Line Friends feat. Minnie)	2017	Dance Party! – Children's English Songs	Promotional songs with Line Friends
"Hwaa" (Golden Day Without a Heart ver.)	2022	Non-album singles	A song for the Thai Webtoon series Golden Day Without a Heart (วันทองไร้ใจ) by Mu.
"Pink Your Moment"	2023	Non-album singles	A promotional single for X-Rated Fusion Liqueur (엑스레이티드).

=== Other charted songs ===
Title	Year	Peak chart positions	Album
Title	Year	KOR DL	Album
"Everytime" (Yuqi feat. Minnie)	2024	61	Yuq1
"Drive U Crazy" (feat. Yuqi)	2025	41	Her
"Cherry Sky"	2025	52	Her
"Valentine's Dream"	2025	53	Her
"It's Okay"	2025	44	Her
"Obsession" (feat. Ten)	2025	42	Her

== Videography ==
=== Music videos ===
Title	Year	Album	Director(s)	Ref.
"Empire" (with Wengie)	2019	Empire	Choi Hyo-bin (Gravitas)	
"Pink Your Moment"	2023	Non-album single	Unknown	
"Not OK" (with Loco)	2023	Weak	Bang Jaeyeob	
"Blind Eyes Red"	2025	Her	Eehosoo (Cpbeq)	
"Her"	2025	Her	Kim Min-ju (Hattrick)	
"To the Moon :)"	2026	I Love You to the Moon and Back	Unknown	

== Filmography ==
=== Films ===
Year	Title	Role	Notes	Ref.
2026	Henry's First Dates	Lucy	Her feature film debut	

=== Television series ===
Year	Title	Role	Notes	Ref.
2026	The Season	Herself	Hong Kong-American drama series (Ep. 2)	

=== Web series ===
Year	Title	Role	Notes	Ref.
2021	So Not Worth It	Minnie	Sitcom	

=== Television shows ===
Year	Title	Notes	Ref.
2019	Five Actors	Cast member	
2020	Minnie Soojin's i'M THE TREND	Cast member with Soojin	
2020	Play Seoul	Tour guide with Yuqi, Hip Street Tour	
2021	King of Mask Singer	Contestant as "Cockle" (Ep. 295–296)	
2025	Knowing International High School	Cast member	

=== Hosting ===
Year	Title	Notes	Ref.
2023	KCON 2023 Thailand	with BamBam (March 18 to 19)	

== Composition credits ==
All song credits are adapted from the Korea Music Copyright Association's database, unless otherwise noted.

Year	Album	Song	Lyrics		Music	
Year	Album	Song	Credited	With	Credited	With
2019	I Made	"Blow Your Mind"	Yes	FlowBlow, Soyeon	Yes	Big Sancho
2019	Latata	"For You"	Yes	FCMHoudini, Soyeon, Eri Osanai (Japanese Lyrics)	Yes	FCMHoudini
2019	Empire	"Empire" (with Wengie)	Yes	72, Melanie Fontana, Michel Schulz, Wendy Huang	No	—N/a
2020	Two Yoo Project Sugar Man 3 Episode 8	"Show"	No	—N/a	No	—N/a
2020	Dumdi Dumdi	"I'm the Trend"	Yes	Yuqi, Soyeon, FCMHoudini	Yes	FCMHoudini, Yuqi, Yuto
2020	Oh My God	"Tung-Tung (Empty)"	Yes	FCMHoudini, Soyeon	Yes	FCMHoudini
2021	I Burn	"Moon"	No	—N/a	Yes	FCMHoudini, 667
2021	I Burn	"Dahlia"	Yes	BreadBeat, Soyeon	Yes	BreadBeat
2022	I Never Die	"Already"	Yes	FCMHoudini, Soyeon	Yes	FCMHoudini
2022	I Never Die	"Escape"	Yes	BreadBeat, Soyeon	Yes	BreadBeat
2022	I Love	"Change"	Yes	Soyeon	Yes	BreadBeat
2022	I Love	"Sculpture"	Yes	BreadBeat, Soyeon	Yes	Houdini
2023	I Feel	"Lucid"	Yes	Soyeon	Yes	BreadBeat, Sinkung
2023	I Feel	"Paradise"	Yes	B.O, Soyeon	Yes	BreadBeat
2024	2	"Vision"	Yes	Miyeon, Roydo	Yes	BreadBeat, Shin Kung
2024	2	"7 Days"	Yes	Tim Tan	Yes	BreadBeat
2024	I Sway	"Bloom"	Yes	B.O.	Yes	BreadBeat, Cashcow
2025	Her	"Blind Eyes Red"	Yes	Tim Tan	No	—N/a
2025	Her	"Her"	Yes	BIG Naughty, Charlotte, Tim Tan	Yes	BreadBeat, Shin Kung, Cashcow, Tim Tan
2025	Her	"Drive U Crazy" (feat. Yuqi of (G)I-dle)	Yes	Bård Bonsaksen, Hilda Stenmalm	No	—N/a
2025	Her	"Cherry Sky"	Yes	Chloe Angelides, Liza Owen	Yes	DallasK, Chloe Angelides, Liza Owen
2025	Her	"Valentine's Dream"	Yes	Houdini	Yes	Houdini, BreadBeat, Shin Kung
2025	Her	"It's Okay" (익숙해)	Yes	Houdini	Yes	Houdini, BreadBeat, Cashcow
2025	Her	"Obsession" (feat. Ten of WayV)	Yes	Tim Tan, Tytan	Yes	Houdini, Coolcat, BreadBeat, Tim Tan
2025	We Are	"Chain"	Yes	Tim Tan	Yes	BreadBeat, Cashcow, B.O.

=== Others ===
Year	Song	Album	Artist	Notes
2018	"Hann (Alone)"	Digital single	(G)I-dle	Whistle
2020	"I'm the Trend"	Dumdi Dumdi	(G)I-dle	Chorus
2020	"Dumdi Dumdi"	Dumdi Dumdi	(G)I-dle	Whistle
2022	"Thief"	Undo	Heize	Chorus

== Awards and nominations ==
Award	Year	Category	Recipient(s)	Result	Ref.
Joox Thailand Music Awards	2022	Collaboration Song of the Year	"Money Honey" (with F. Hero and UrboyTJ)	Nominated	
MAMA Awards	2023	Best Collaboration	"Expectations" (with Anne-Marie)	Nominated	
MAMA Awards	2023	Song of the Year	"Expectations" (with Anne-Marie)	Nominated	
Seoul International Drama Awards	2021	Outstanding Korean Drama OST	"We Already Fell In Love" (with Miyeon)	Nominated	
Seoul Music Awards	2025	Main Prize (Bonsang)	Minnie	Nominated	
Seoul Music Awards	2025	Popularity Award	Minnie	Nominated	
Seoul Music Awards	2025	K-Wave Special Award	Minnie	Nominated	
Seoul Music Awards	2025	K-pop World Choice – Solo	Minnie	Nominated	
Seoul Music Awards	2025	OST Award	"Like a Dream"	Nominated	
