= Moon ((G)I-dle song) =

2021 song by (G)I-dle

"Moon"

Song by (G)I-dle

from the EP I Burn
- Released: January 11, 2021
- Studio: Cube Studio
- Genre: Pop
- Length: 3:20
- Label: Cube; Republic
- Songwriter: Soyeon
- Producers: Minnie; FCM Houdini; FCM 667

Audio video
- "Moon" on YouTube

"Moon" (stylized in all caps) is a song by South Korean girl group (G)I-dle from their fourth Korean-language extended play, I Burn (2021). The song was written by Soyeon, and its producers Minnie, FCM Houdini and FCM 667. The song was released on January 11, 2021, as the third track on the album.

== Background ==
In an interview with Hypebae, (G)I-dle explained "Moon" touches on the desire to hide one's feelings. Minnie, who is in charge of composing "Moon" described that the song contains honest feelings that cannot be shown to others. "I personally cherish it so much." The song was composed by Minnie with the thought of the Moon, as she described "so bright that I can see my reflection, and hide my feelings and fears because I was so sad." When she was asked if it was difficult to write lyrics, Minnie responded, "With "Moon", Because it's Soyeon who you can trust when it comes to songs, I entrusted the lyrics to her. It was really good, I really liked it. I thought about the moon when I wrote this song, and I told Soyeon that. I'm really thankful that she wrote the lyrics beautifully."

== Music and lyrics ==
"Moon" has been described as a pop genre song that builds up a dancerable disco rhythm, bass, and synthesizer with an addictive hook melody. It is a song that depicts a situation in which the darkness was taken away from the night when the moon was bright, and it tells that there is an honest feeling that cannot be shown to others. In terms of musical notation, the song is composed in the key of A minor, with a tempo of 96 beats per minute, and runs for three minutes and 20 seconds.

== Critical reception ==
Upon release, Verónica A. Bastardo of The Quietus wrote, "It is easy to get lost between the many K-pop girl groups that go with the classic hip-hop/pop/EDM/I’m-a-badass-and-I’ll-show-you sound and the bubblegum-pop/dancehall/high-pitched-voices-from-the-girl-next-door one. So it’s refreshing to hear a tracklist that is musically daring, by experimenting with genre mixes and exploring universal emotions through vulnerability and figurative narratives." and further added, "Like 'Moon', that combines the characteristic East Asian instrumentation and electro-rock to beg the nocturnal satellite to pleeeaase stop shining so I can hide my sadness in the dark." Melon Magazine called the song "unique dreaminess". Beats Per Minute's JT Early stated the song is the "highlight on the album" as it "details the importance of processing, emphasising that once the anger has been drained away, you are left to deal with the raw emotional aftermath." The author described "Moon" as a "beautiful, dynamic song about wanting to stay concealed in the darkness to process the wounds that have been inflicted" with "bewitching production consisting of plucked strings, guitars, organs and synths which culminates in a mystical feel." Also praised that the group can be "lyrically honest about the post-breakup agoraphobia – the need to stay in your own space to heal after your heart is shattered." Writer Skye Sutton of The Kraze agreed that this song has Minnie's "signature sound" as her songs "always have a certain flair [...] that’s very refreshing in an industry". She also called the song "a great track that gives you a rather neutral feeling, like you’re in the middle stages of realization, denial, and recovery."

== Track listing ==
- Download and streaming
1. "Moon" – 3:20

== Credits and personnel ==
Credits are adapted from Cube Entertainment, and NetEase Music.

- (G)I-dle – Vocals
  - Minnie – Producer, audio engineer, background vocal
  - Soyeon – Songwriter
- FCM Houdini – Producer, audio engineer, guitar, synthesizer
- FCM 667 – Producer, bass
- Jeon Jae-hee – Background vocal
- Kim Dong-min – Guitar
- Hanseul – Keyboard
- Shin Jae-bin (Cube Studio) – Record engineering, audio mixing
- Choi Ye-ji (Cube Studio) – Record engineering
- Kwon Nam-woo (821 Sound mastering) – Audio mastering
- Jang Seung-ho (821 Sound mastering) – Assistant audio mastering

== Charts ==
Chart (2021)	Peak position
South Korea (Gaon Digital)	102
South Korea (K-pop Hot 100)	72
