= Empire (single album) =

Single album by Wengie featuring Minnie
- Released: October 18, 2019
- Recorded: 2019
- Language: English; Korean
- Label: Unicorn Pop

Singles from Empire
- 1. "Empire" Released: October 18, 2019

Music video
- "Empire" on YouTube

Empire is a single album by Chinese-Australian YouTuber Wengie featuring Minnie from South Korean girl group (G)I-dle. It was released on October 18, 2019, by Unicorn Pop and distributed by LINYL. It consists of the title track "Empire" in three different versions, Korean, English, and Korean and English. A music video was also released alongside the single.

The song was released through several music portals, including MelOn, Apple Music, and Spotify.

== Background ==
On October 15, it was announced that Wengie and Minnie teamed up for a collaboration song "Empire". The collaboration is part of Wengie's 'World Wide Music Project' following the project of her first single with Filipino pop star Iñigo Pascual on May 4.

According to Wengie, "Empire" is a song about 'Girl power' and contains a message that cheers and encourages the listeners.

== Composition ==
The song was composed by Melanie Fontana and Michel “Lindgren” Schulz. It was described as a "Korean-English hybrid propelled by a pulsating, clapping beat and trap percussion" and "bilingual female empowerment banger".

== Commercial performance ==
"Empire" debuted at number 22 on the Billboard World Digital Songs. The song was featured in E! News's mixtape, The MixtapE where they select their favorite new songs and added into it.

== Track listing ==
No.	Title	Lyrics	Music	Length
1.	"Empire"	72; Melanie Fontana; Michel “Lindgren” Schulz; Minnie; Wendy Ayche	Melanie Fontana; Michel “Lindgren” Schulz	3:03
2.	"Empire" (English version)	72; Melanie Fontana; Michel “Lindgren” Schulz; Minnie; Wendy Ayche	Melanie Fontana; Michel “Lindgren” Schulz	3:03
3.	"Empire" (Korean version)	72; Melanie Fontana; Michel “Lindgren” Schulz; Minnie; Wendy Ayche	Melanie Fontana; Michel “Lindgren” Schulz	3:03
4.	"Empire" (Instrumental version)		Melanie Fontana; Michel “Lindgren” Schulz	3:03
Total length:				12:00

== Charts ==
Chart (2019)	Peak position
US World Digital Song Sales (Billboard)	22

== Release history ==
Region	Date	Format	Distributor
Various	October 18, 2019	Digital download, streaming	Unicorn Pop; LINYL
South Korea	October 18, 2019	Digital download, streaming	Unicorn Pop; LINYL
