= Wengie =

Chinese Australian YouTube vlogger, singer, voice actress (born 1986)

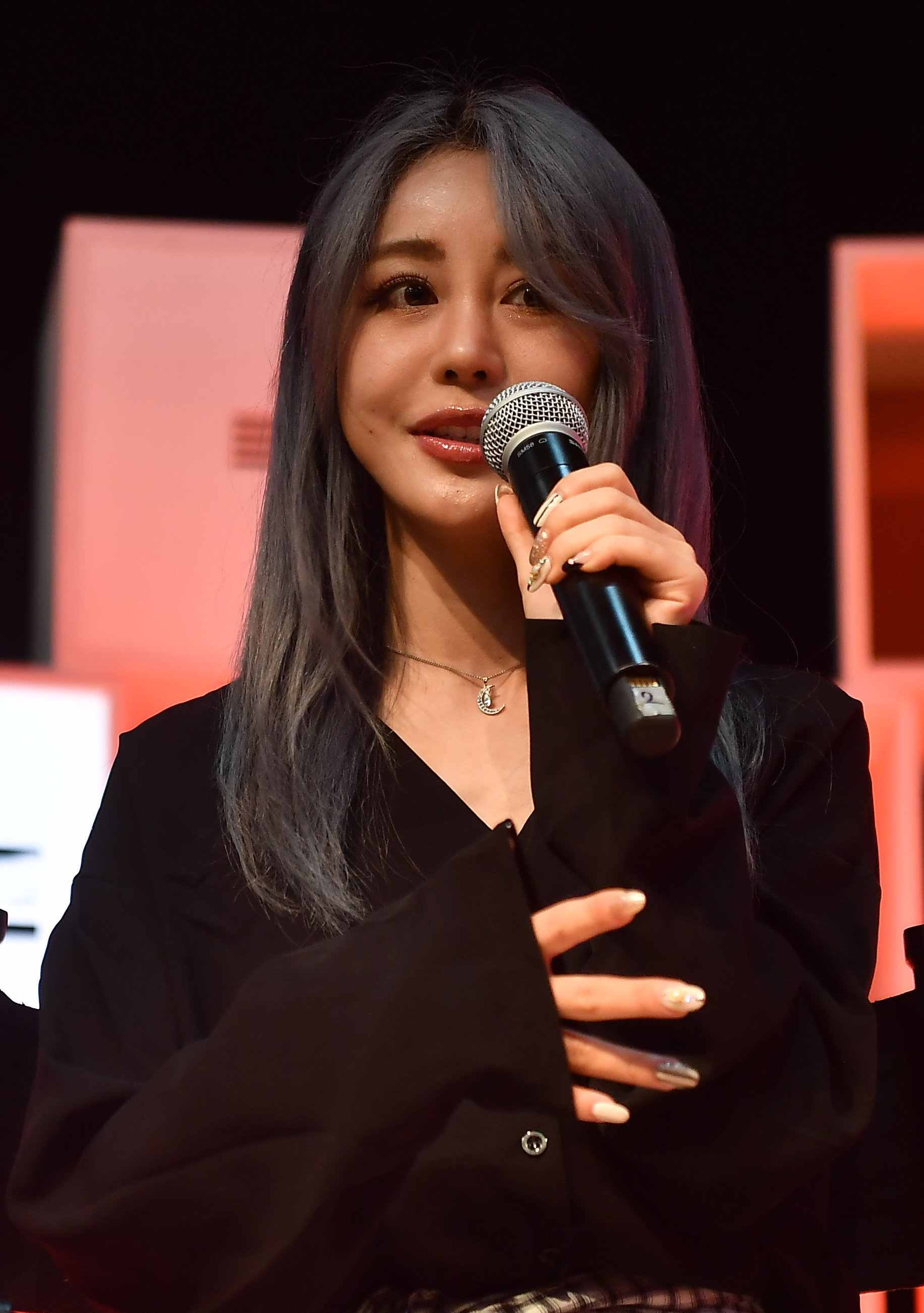
- Wengie at RISE in 2019
- Born: 9 January 1986 (age 40); Guangzhou, Guangdong, China
- Occupations: YouTuber; Singer

YouTube information
- Channel: Wengie
- Years active: 2013–present
- Genres: Beauty; fashion; DIY; life hacks; pranks
- Subscribers: 13.3 million
- Views: 1.89 billion
- Last updated: 20 October 2025

Wendy Ayche (born 9 January 1986), better known as Wengie or WRAYA, is a Chinese–Australian YouTuber, pop singer, and voice actress.

== Career ==
=== YouTube ===
In 2013, Ayche started the Youtube channel, "Wengie", inspired by her Chinese name, Wenjie. Her videos focused on beauty, fashion, and "Do It Yourself" (DIY) tips. As of 2016, she was one of the fastest-growing stars on YouTube, having garnered over 4 million subscribers in three years. Throughout 2018, she focused on children's content: DIY videos, prank videos, and slime videos. She earned over 1.8 billion views over her YouTube career. Her YouTube channel was awarded "Best Channel" and "Overall Winner" at the 2017 Australian Online Video Awards.

In 2013, Wengie created a second YouTube channel called "WengieVlogs". As of November 2017, WengieVlogs had 1.7 million subscribers and 53 million views. In October 2018, she changed the channel's name to "Wendie ft. Wengie". She then changed the name to "Wengie’s Life" about a year later.

In 2018, she was the most popular YouTuber from Australia with 11.5 million subscribers. Her channel was the 6th most subscribed "how-to and style" channel on YouTube in January 2018. As of 2024, her YouTube channel has 13.4 million subscribers.

=== Music ===
==== Wengie ====
Wengie released her first single, "Baby Believe Me", in China on 13 July 2017. It debuted at number 11 and peaked at number 6 on the Chinese music charts. She released another song on YouTube under the channel "Wengie Music Asia" on 25 November 2017, entitled "Oh I Do". As of 2024, the music video had over 11 million views. On 10 July 2018, she released the song "Cake". This was her first English single and was released on her YouTube channel "Wengie Music". The song has over 13 million views. On 4 May 2019, Wengie released her first Filipino-language single "Mr. Nice Guy", which featured Filipino singer Iñigo Pascual. She released her first Korean-language single, "Empire", on 18 October. The song features Thai singer Minnie from K-pop girl group (G)I-dle, and it debuted at No. 22 on the Billboard World Digital Song Sales Chart. On 1 May 2020, she sang on a remix of the song Learn to Meow by XiaoPanPan and XiaoFengFeng. On 5 November 2020, she released the Hindi-English song "Thing You Want" featuring artists Ikka and Shalmali Kholgade, as part of the EP 'Collabs Vol.1'. The song premiered on Big Bang Music and has 1.7 million YouTube views as of 2024. She also released an English version on "Wengie Music". This song earned her the "Best International Act in India" at the Indian The Clef Music Awards. On 9 December 2022, Wengie released the single "This Christmas".

==== WRAYA ====
Under the moniker WRAYA, Wengie has released several musical works since 2021, typically in the C-pop and electropop genres.

=== Voice acting ===
In 2017, Wengie was the voice of Blisstina "Bliss" Utonium in the Australian and New Zealand versions of The Powerpuff Girls: Power of Four, a five-part TV movie.

== Personal life ==
Wengie moved to Australia with her grandparents as a child. She is based in Sydney, Los Angeles, and China.

== Discography ==
=== Extended plays ===
Title	EP details
Collabs Vol. 1 (Int'l Ver.)	Released: 6 November 2020; Label: Unicorn Pop, Create Music Group; Format: Digital download, streaming
11:11	Released: 11 November 2021; Label: Unicorn Pop, Create Music Group; Format: Digital download, streaming

=== Singles ===
As WRAYA
Title	Moniker	Date of release	YouTube view count (as of December 2022)
Bitter	WRAYA	24 June 2021	~769,000
Trust Issues	WRAYA	7 August 2021	~778,000
Tight Rope	WRAYA	2 September 2021	~1 million
Ghost	WRAYA	30 September 2021	~783,000
11:11	WRAYA	11 November 2021	~1.4 million
