= Beam Beam =

2021 single by Jeon So-yeon

Single by Soyeon

from the album Windy
- Released: July 5, 2021
- Studio: Doobdoob Studio
- Genre: Pop rock; hip hop
- Length: 2:47
- Label: Cube; Universal Music; Republic
- Lyricist: Soyeon
- Producers: Soyeon; Pop Time

Soyeon singles chronology
"Idle Song" (2018)	"Beam Beam" (2021)

Music video
- "삠삠 (BEAM BEAM)" on YouTube

"Beam Beam" (stylized in all caps; Korean: 삠삠; RR: Ppimppim) is a song recorded by South Korean rapper and record producer Soyeon, released on July 5, 2021, by Cube Entertainment and Republic Records as the lead single of her first extended play, Windy. "Beam Beam" was described as "a hot and strong taste that reminds of summer".

<3

== Composition ==
"Beam Beam" was described as a pop-rock and hip hop genre song that expresses the sun's scorching rays. The song is composed in the key of A♯ minor, 110 beats per minute with a running time of 2:47 minutes.

== Credits and personnel ==
Credits are adapted from Cube Entertainment and NetEase Music.

- Soyeon – vocals, producing, songwriting, rap arrangement, audio engineer
- Pop Time – co-producing, audio engineer
- Kako – audio engineer, keyboard
- Kim Dong-min – Guitar
- Bass Cho In-seong – Bass
- Park Ji-yong – Keyboard
- Jang Woo-young (Doobdoob Studio) – Record engineering, digital editor
- Stay Tuned (Stay Tuned Studio) – Audio mixing
- Kwon Nam-woo (821 Sound mastering) – Audio mastering
- Jang Seung-ho (821 Sound mastering) – Assistant audio mastering

== Promotion ==
On July 5, before the album's release, Soyeon held a showcase event for the media where she talked about the process of making the album. The singer also performed the song for the first time. On the same day, Soyeon appeared on 1theK Originals' The Booth with a live band, and Naver Now #OUTNOW Jeon So-yeon. It is a 3-part comeback project and viewable audio show every Monday at 8 pm KST.

== Music video ==
An accompanying music video for "Beam Beam" was uploaded to (G)I-dle's official YouTube channel on July 5, 2021. It was preceded by two teasers released on the same platform on July 3 and 4.

== Accolades ==
Music program awards for "Beam Beam"
Program	Date	Ref.
The Show	July 13, 2021	
M Countdown	July 29, 2021	

== Charts ==
Weekly charts for "Beam Beam"
Chart (2021)	Peak position
South Korea (K-pop Hot 100)	71
South Korea (Gaon)	115

== Release history ==
Release history for "Beam Beam"
Region	Date	Format	Distributor
Various	July 5, 2021	Digital download; streaming	Cube; Kakao M; U-Cube; Republic
