= Wow Thing =

2018 single by Station Young

Single by Seulgi, SinB, Chung Ha, and Soyeon
- Released: September 28, 2018
- Studio: In Grid Studio
- Length: 2:51
- Label: SM; IRiver
- Composers: Karen Poole; Anne Judith Stokke Wik; Sonny J Mason
- Lyricists: Soyeon; Jo Yoon-kyung

SM Station X 0 singles chronology
"We Young" (2018)	"Wow Thing" (2018)	"Written in the Stars" (2018)

Seulgi singles chronology
"Selfish" (2018)	"Wow Thing" (2018)	"Hello Tutorial" (2018)

Chung Ha singles chronology
"Love U" (2018)	"Wow Thing" (2018)	"Whatcha Doin'" (2018)

SinB singles chronology
"Wow Thing" (2018)	"Be Yourself" (2020)

Soyeon singles chronology
"Idle Song" (2018)	"Wow Thing" (2018)	"You Too? Me Too!" (2019)

Music video
- "Wow Thing" on YouTube

"Wow Thing" is a song by South Korean artists Seulgi from Red Velvet, soloist and former I.O.I member Chung Ha, SinB, member of Viviz and GFriend, and Soyeon from I-dle. The single was released on 28 September 2018, by SM Entertainment as part of a special season of SM Station.

The single was released on September 28, 2018, through several music portals including iTunes.

== Composition ==
A bright, R&B-influenced pop song, "Wow Thing" puts the foursome's powerful vocals in the spotlight and showcases their dynamic through its accompanying music video, released through SM Entertainment's Station X 0 project. The song emphasizes on self-love and confidence in the people's actions, urging them to be positive while finding their own path.

== Members ==
- Seulgi (슬기) – member of Red Velvet
- Chung Ha (청하) – soloist, former member of I.O.I
- SinB (신비) – member of Viviz and GFriend
- Soyeon (소연) – member of I-dle

== Track listing ==
- Digital download / streaming
1. "Wow Thing" – 2:51
2. "Wow Thing (Instrumental)" – 2:51

== Credits and personnel ==
Credits adapted from Melon.

Studio

- Recorded at In Grid Studio
- Digitally edited at doobdoob Studio
- Engineered for mix at SM Booming System
- Mixed at 821 Sound
- Mastered at 821 Sound Mastering

Personnel

- SM Entertainment – executive producer
- Seulgi – vocals, background vocals
- SinB – vocals, background vocals
- Chung Ha – vocals, background vocals
- Soyeon – vocals, background vocals, lyrics
- Jo Yoon-kyung – lyrics
- Karen Poole – composition
- Anne Judith Wik – composition
- Sonny J. Mason – composition, arrangement
- Yoo Young-jin – engineered for mix, music and sound supervisor
- Kim Jin-hwan – vocal directing
- Yang Geun-young – background vocals
- Woo Min-jeong – recording
- Jung Woo-young – digital editing
- MasterKey – mixing
- Kwon Nam-woo – mastering

== Charts ==
=== Weekly charts ===
Weekly chart performance for "Wow Thing"
Chart (2019)	Peak position
South Korea (Gaon)	35
South Korea (K-pop Hot 100)	43
US World Digital Song Sales (Billboard)	3

=== Monthly charts ===
Monthly chart performance for "Wow Thing"
Chart (October 2019)	Position
South Korea (Gaon)	74
