= Windy (EP) =

2021 EP by Jeon So-yeon

- Digital cover

EP by Soyeon
- Released: July 5, 2021
- Recorded: 2020–2021
- Studio: Doobdoob Studio (Seoul)
- Genres: K-pop; hip hop; dance-pop; pop-rock
- Length: 14:04
- Languages: Korean; English
- Labels: Cube; Republic; Kakao
- Producers: Soyeon; Pop Time

Soyeon chronology
Windy (2021)	What a Wonderful Life (2026)

Singles from Windy
- 1. "Beam Beam" Released: July 5, 2021

Windy is the debut extended play by South Korean rapper and record producer Soyeon. It was released digitally on July 5, 2021, and physically on July 6, 2021, through Cube Entertainment and Republic Records. Windy consists of five tracks, including the lead single "Beam Beam". The album introduces Soyeon's alter ego Windy, who explores her current and dream 20's.

== Background ==
On May 21, 2021, it was reported that Soyeon would be releasing a solo album after 4 years. In an interview with Vogue Korea for the July edition, Soyeon expressed the difference between Windy and her group's albums, "(G)I-dle is meaningful in itself, but I couldn't show everything I wanted to do. I made music that suits (G)I-dle, and the music that fans want. Even before my debut, the music I wanted to do on my own was piled up. I picked it up and put it in this album." To Soyeon, Windy is her other self, describing her as "a friend who is as free as the wind and doesn't care about others."

== Artwork and packaging ==
The Windy package design is reminiscent of a fast food takeout box. It features a cartoon character, which is a parody of the Wendy's mascot, carrying a flag with a hamburger on it. The EP comes with a booklet, CD, CD package, lyric paper, postcard, photo card, mini photo stand, membership card, sticker, coaster and poster which is only available for pre-order. The album was produced in limited physical copies, making the product sold out only after a few months of release.

== Composition ==
Windy is an album released from the perspective of Soyeon's alter ego, a free soul like the wind, which contains songs of various genres and unique concepts. The opening song "Beam Beam" is a pop rock and hip hop song expressing the sun's rays, heralding the birth of an all-time summer song. "Weather" was a previously unreleased song that fans have been waiting for, first hinted on KakaoTV's Face ID where she made an appearance on the show. "Quit" has been described as a song that anyone can enjoy comfortably, while "Psycho" is a song with impressive beats. The last track, "Is This Bad B****** Number?", featuring Bibi and winner of High School Rapper 3's Lee Young-ji, is a song that shows the chemistry of Generation Z, described in a press release.

== Promotion ==
On June 17, Cube released an artwork teaser containing a character wearing a chef's hat and a hamburger flag as an illustration with a yellow background and mint colour fonts and the phrase 'Grand Open 2021.07.05 18:00 (KST)'. On June 21, a concept teaser video with background music titled "Windy Burger" composed and written by Soyeon was released. The following day, a promotional schedule for the album was released through her official group homepage and social media. Soyeon then released Blooming Windy Day 1 and Day 2, documentary videos featuring her family, co-workers, producers, staff member, childhood friends, showing off her daily life and work as an "artist idol" with composing, writing and producing skills, and the contents of her first mini-album Windy. On June 28 and 29, Soyeon released four concept images showing her chameleon-like side hip image in kitsch fashion with intense eyes and a provocative expression, fatal and chic image. An album preview with snippets of the EP's tracks was uploaded on July 1. Two music video teasers for the title track, "Beam Beam", have been posted before its release on July 3 and 4.

To commemorate the release of the album, the global entertainment platform Makestar and Dearmymuse opened the one-on-one video call event page.

== Track listing ==
All tracks were written solo by Soyeon while it was composed and arranged by Soyeon and Pop Time otherwise noted.

Windy track listing
No.	Title	Lyrics	Music	Arrangement	Length
1.	"Beam Beam" (삠삠)		Soyeon; Pop Time; Kako	Pop Time; Kako; Soyeon	2:47
2.	"Weather"				2:45
3.	"Quit"				3:09
4.	"Psycho"				2:35
5.	"Is This Bad B****** Number?" (featuring Bibi, Lee Young-ji)	Soyeon; Bibi; Lee Young-ji	Soyeon; Kako; Flip_00	Kako; Flip_00; Nathan; Pop Time	2:45
Total length:					14:04

== Charts ==
Weekly chart performance for Windy
Chart (2021)	Peak position
South Korean Albums (Gaon)	7

== Release history ==
Release dates and formats for Windy
Region	Date	Format	Label
Various	July 5, 2021	Download; streaming	Cube; Republic Records; Kakao M; U-Cube
Various	July 6, 2021	CD	Cube; Republic Records; Kakao M; U-Cube
