= Dumdi Dumdi (song) =

2020 single by (G)I-dle

Single by (G)I-dle

from the album Dumdi Dumdi
- B-side: "I'm the Trend"
- Released: August 3, 2020
- Studio: Cube Studio
- Genre: Dance-pop; moombahton
- Length: 3:30
- Label: Cube; Republic
- Songwriter: Soyeon
- Producers: Soyeon; Pop Time

(G)I-dle singles chronology
| "I'm the Trend" (2020) | "Dumdi Dumdi" (2020) | "The Baddest" (2020) |

Music video
- "DUMDi DUMDi" on YouTube

"Dumdi Dumdi" (Korean: 덤디덤디; RR: Deomdi Deomdi, stylized as "DUMDi DUMDi") is a song recorded by South Korean girl group (G)I-dle, released on August 3, 2020, by Cube Entertainment and Republic Records as the lead single of the group's single album of the same name. It was written by member Soyeon, who also produced the song alongside Pop Time who has produced many of Zico and Block B's songs.

"Dumdi Dumdi" was described as (G)I-dle's style of a summer dance song. Musically, it is a tropical-based rhythm with moombahton song featuring lyrics that evoke 'hot, cold, passion and excitement' that are reminiscent of summer and youth. An accompanying music video for the song was uploaded onto (G)I-dle's YouTube channel simultaneously with the single's release. Upon release, the music video broke their own record amassing 17.6 million views in 24 hours. "Dumdi Dumdi" peaked at number eight on the Gaon Digital Chart the week of August 23, nearly a month after release.

== Background and release ==
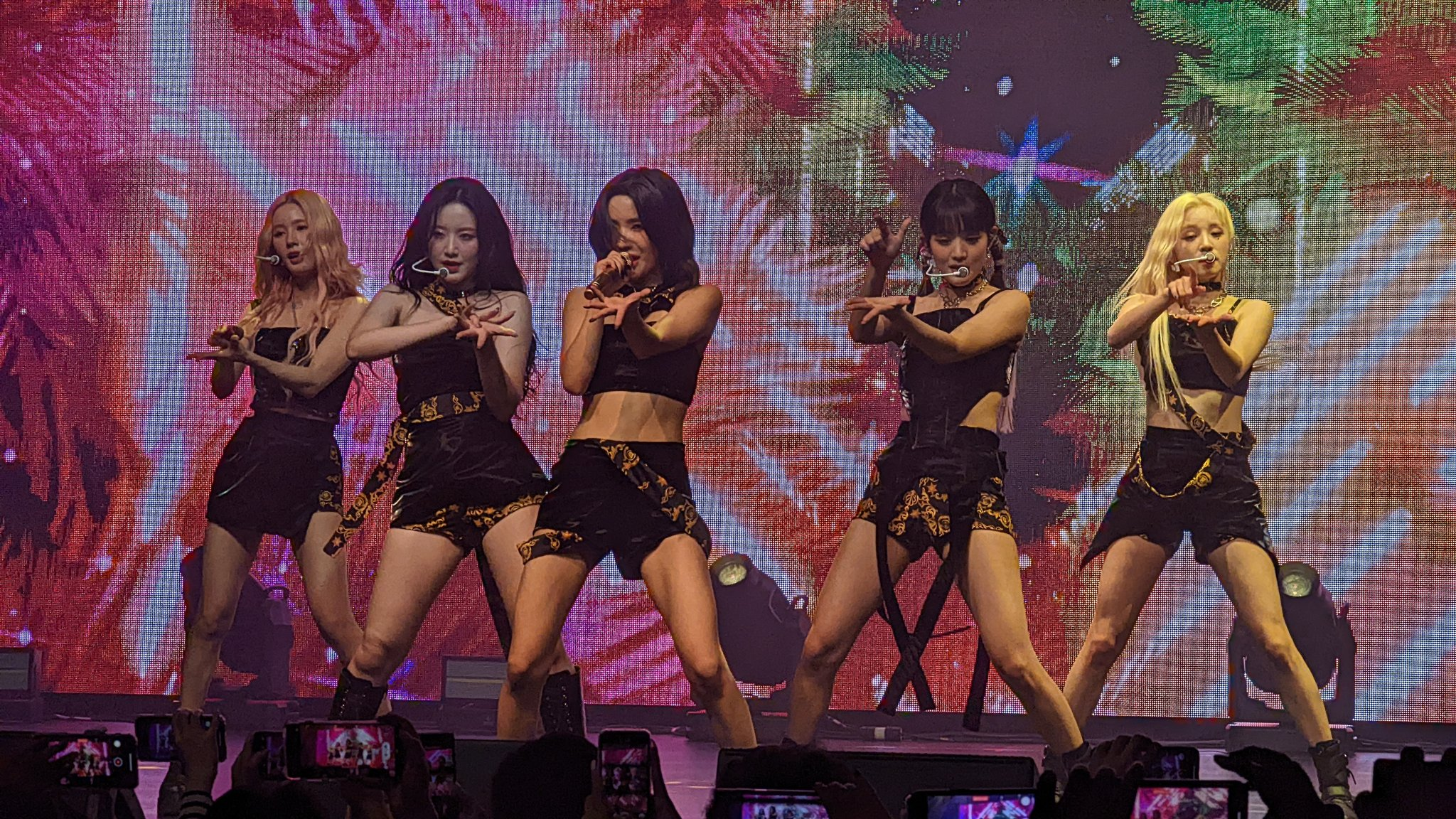
(G)I-dle performing "Dumdi Dumdi" at Warfield Theatre in San Francisco, California on July 24, 2022

(G)I-dle took a shift in their style of music, from dark and sinister "Hann (Alone)" in summer 2018, '90s-inspired hip-hop cut "Uh-Oh" in summer 2019, and charismatic, intense and dreamy for "Oh My God", to a vibrant and youthful summer song "Dumdi Dumdi" for summer 2020. The single was released in Korean, Japanese and Mandarin language. This is (G)I-dle's first song to feature a Chinese version in their discography. Member Yuqi was credited for "Dumdi Dumdi" Chinese lyrics and guide alongside Z King. Soyeon revealed that she received inspiration for the track from the 2016 Disney's Zootopia. The members of the group participated in visual concept planning such as photos of hair and makeup, and styling that gives a vintage feeling for (G)I-dle type of summer. Hours after the release, Soyeon went live on V Live. She revealed the meaning of "Dumdi Dumdi":

"Dumdi Dumdi meaning is youth. I wanted to record who I am in this time, what I can do only at this age. Youth, I think I am enjoying my youth. I especially enjoy my work when everything blazes up [passion]. I think you guys feel this kind of heat and coldness in whatever you are doing too. Whether that be work or love [...] Youth is when even in the most burning passion, the sharp wind blows from time to time. A good feeling that can cool things down or heat things up even more.

— Soyeon on the meaning of Dumdi Dumdi and Youth, V Live

On November 25, a special section on MBC M's Show Champion aired where Soyeon explained the recording process of "Dumdi Dumdi". She revealed that the song was recorded 7 times and the word 'Dumdi Dumdi' were to replicate sounds of drums and a beating heart. A Chinese version of the song is available only on NetEase Music. A Japanese version of the song was released on August 26, 2020, for their 2nd Japanese EP Oh My God.

== Composition and lyrics ==
The song is in the key of E major, 123 bpm with a running time of 3:30 minutes. "Dumdi Dumdi" is an upbeat dance pop track song with tropical drum beats and a strong moombahton rhythm with booming percussion. The song has light latin pop influences and a subtle incorporation of the dependably "catchy" whistle hook and the onomatopoeic refrain of "Dumdi Dumdi".

Soyeon explained several specific lyrics on August 3, V Live. "With the hot sun I’m a little crazy / My cheeks are easily flushed", explaining that the sun was an excuse for her to go crazy — "I’m going crazy because of my passion"; "And then I feel dizzy and flushed / Like swimming I start dancing", explaining that she wanted to express something like, "did this person drink?", "kind of dizzy", “so exciting”; "The wind makes my heart beat / The waves make my heart pound", explaining that her youth is like the summer and the wind and waves are the songs; "Like this I want to close my eyes tightly / Forever even if the sun rises", she commented that she wants to live her youth passionately until 100; "When the moon falls asleep and the summer is cooled down / Sing to me the song of the hot time", explaining that she wanted to tell her fans – "when you feel like your passion is cooling off, you have to listen to this song."

== Critical reception ==
Professional ratings
Review scores
| Source | Rating |
|---|---|
| Billboard | favorable |
| Forbes | positive |
| IZM | 2.5/5 stars |

"Dumdi Dumdi" was met with generally positive reviews from music critics. Jeff Benjamin writing for Forbes wrote that the song is flirty and fun cut boasting booming percussion, and praised Soyeon for trying out vocal manipulation effects while "simultaneously spitting some of her fastest rhymes to date on the second verse." One Music PH called the song "an unpredictable and undeniable genre-breaking anthem." In his review for the Clash, Robin Murray described "Dumdi Dumdi" as "immaculate pop banger that walks in its own lane." Lee Nam-kyung of the MBN Star concluded that "(G)I-dle were able to highlight their own summer in their hip and unique charm, and show the aspect of a concept craftsman that fits the trend."

IZM writer Son Kiho opined "the song expresses youthful passion by borrowing the heat of summer, emphasizing the refreshing feeling with the sound of the waves, voice samples, and the moombahton rhythm with a cheerful percussion on the front. Each element of the arrangement faithfully captures the sense of the season by adding the whistle of the chorus, but it is somewhat familiar. The aim of the summer song dilutes the attractiveness of (G)I-dle, who broke away from the existing formula and raised momentum with an independent move, and left a distinctive result as the weight was removed for a more friendly approach." Jason Lipshutz of Billboard deemed the song "have the potential for a successful viral trend – that hook sounds designed to thrive on TikTok". Hong Seon-hwa from Biz Entertainment wrote in his article that (G)I-dle "carried on the legacy of summer songs".

== Commercial performance ==
"Dumdi Dumdi" debuted at number 27 on the Gaon Digital Chart with Gaon index of 13,623,261 for the week ending August 8, 2020. Additionally, the song debuted at number 15 on the US Billboard World Digital Song Sales chart.

== Track listing ==
- Digital download / streaming
1. "Dumdi Dumdi" – 3:30
- Digital download / streaming – Japanese
1. "Dumdi Dumdi" (Japanese version) – 3:31

== Credits and personnel ==
Credits are adapted from Cube Entertainment, and NetEase Music.

- (G)I-dle – vocals
  - Soyeon – producing, songwriting, rap arrangement, audio engineer
  - Minnie – whistle
  - Yuqi – Chinese translation, guide
- Pop Time – producing, audio engineer
- Jeon Jae-hee – chorus
- Wooseok of Pentagon - chorus
- Kim Ho-hyun – guitar
- Park Ji-yong – keyboard
- Jeon Bu-yeon (Cube Studio) – record engineering, recording engineer
- Gu Jong-pil (Cube Studio) – mixing engineer
- Jeong Yoo-ra (Cube Studio) – assistant mixing engineer
- Kwon Nam-woo (821 Sound mastering) – mastering engineer
- Z KING – Chinese translation, guide

== Live performances ==
On August 13, 2020, (G)I-dle performed "Dumdi Dumdi" on Soribada Best K-Music Awards. They also performed on Korea On Stage - Suwon Hwaseong Fortress, hosted by the Cultural Heritage Administration and Suwon City and organized by the Korea Cultural Heritage Foundation and KBS Korea Broadcasting Day. The performance was aired on September 3, 2020. On September 3, (G)I-dle performed "Dumdi Dumdi" on VENN's Guest House with Chrissy Costanza.

== Promotion ==
(G)I-dle kicked off promotions by appearing on V Live's LieV on August 4. Miyeon, Minnie and Yuqi appeared as guests on August 5 episode of TMI News's Best summer songs that must be listened in the summer and performed a preview of "Dumdi Dumdi". The group appeared as guest on August 6 episode of SBS Power FM's Cultwo Show. The group partnered up with Makestar to hold a global fan meeting. Fans participating in the video call event, began on August 4–13, was given a limited edition photo card when purchasing the album through Makestar. On August 4, the group attended the broadcast recording for August 11 episode of Arirang's After School Club. (G)I-dle promoted the song on various radio shows, including SBS Power FM Lee Jun's Youngstreet, PlayJ's K-pop star guerrilla, SBS Power FM Park So-hyun's Lovegame, Naver Now Ha Sung-woon's Late Night Idol show, Naver Now Moonbyul's Avengirls, and KBS Cool FM's Park Won's Kiss the Radio. On August 22, Miyeon and Soyeon appeared on Amazing Saturday episode 122. The same day, Soyeon appeared as the first guest on JTBC's Just Comedy new section, I'm Crazy about My MBTI. On August 30, the group appeared on 2 Days & 1 Night's Special Summer Vacation Mission.

To promote the song, (G)I-dle launched the hashtag #dumdidumdi and Dumdi Dumdi Challenge, a dance challenge with the song on various social media platforms such as TikTok, Twitter and Instagram. The group promoted the song with a series of live performances on various music programs starting with Mnet's M! Countdown on August 6. This was followed by performance on SBS's Inkigayo, SBS MTV's The Show, MBC Music's Show Champion, and KBS's Music Bank. (G)I-dle has also performed the song live, including during the group's attendance at 2020 Soribada Best K-Music Awards.

== Music video ==
An accompanying music video for "Dumdi Dumdi" was uploaded to (G)I-dle's official YouTube channel on August 3, 2020. It was choreographed by Lee Jung-lee who had previously choreographed Itzy's "Wannabe", Twice's "More and More", Somi's "What You Waiting For" and Blackpink's "How You Like That". It was directed by director Jang Jaehyeok and Lee Kyeongsoon of Bibbidi Bobbidi Boo production team. The producer is Kim Soohan and assistant director, Lee Hohyeon. Other key personnel were directors of photography Acam Yang Gyunsang and Bcam Kim Deokjung, while the camera crew was Kim Jinhyeong, Seon Hoseong, Hwang Gyoha and Yang Hyeonu. The Gaffer were Park Jaegwang, Jeon Eunyeong as the Art Director and lighting crew Lee Minsoo, Lee Hyeonsu, Jung Mungyun, Lee Seonmin, Jung Yujin and Kim Hamin. The video featured Yong Yong the iguana. The members took a style transformation with members in retro style outfits and stand out accessories to emphasize the coolness.

The video begins with a statement, "When the sun strikes the heart of the desert, the wandering souls come across each other at an outdated motel where human vestiges are barely traceable... There is a special life story behind each soul, and together, they end up spending the most burningly compelling day of their lives." In the background of an outdated desert with exotic elements such as iguanas and parrots, campers and horses, showing members with different stories meeting at a sleepy motel to hold a summer party. As the video progressing, the scenes overall change into colourful and vivid colours, giving a contrasting look to the intro part of the film. It has a little reminiscent of the fashion and vibes usually seen at American summer music festivals like Coachella and Burning Man. The music video also incorporates summer essentials such as a camping car, bonfire, swimming pool, colorful confetti and fancy outfits. In the video, Miyeon, an actress on her vacation alone; Minnie the wanderer enjoying her freedom; the homebody Soojin; Soyeon riding a convertible, Yuqi the cowgirl crossing the dessert and a part-time waitress, Shuhua. The video cuts to Soyeon, stood in front of an old motel located in the middle of the desert, carrying a large bag of luggage and was surprised by the discovery of Shuhua in the cafeteria. Towards the end, they end up becoming friends, having the time of their lives and leaving their troubles behind.

A dance performance music video was released through the Mu:fully official YouTube channel. A retro-style lyric video was released on August 7, 2020. The video contains party sets and animals that appear in the music video of "Dumdi Dumdi". On August 11, the dance practice video for "Dumdi Dumdi" was released on both (G)I-dle's official YouTube and V Live channel.

=== Reception ===
The music video surpassed 10 million views in 10 hours, breaking its own record which was 2 hours faster than "Oh My God". The music video garnered 17.6 million views on YouTube in 24 hours, surpassing their previous record with "Oh My God" which gained 17 million views. In addition, the music video ranks on YouTube real-time trending in 35 regions around the world, including 3rd in South Korea, 2nd in Paraguay, 3rd in Chile, and 5th in Brazil. It later went on exceeding 18 million views in Sina Weibo in 18 hours, and ranked 25th in Weibo's real-time search query. The related hashtag on Weibo has received 130 million interactions. On August 5, the music video hit 30 million views, becoming the group's fastest music video in 40 hours.

== Usage in media ==
"Dumdi Dumdi" was featured on August 16, episode 343 The Return of Superman, and on August 20, episode 8 Flower of Evil. On August 25, a snippet of the song's chorus was played on TV Chosun's Wife's Taste. On September 1, "Dumdi Dumdi" was played as the opening song for Sporty Sisters (Korean: 노는언니), a variety show featuring South Korean female athletes.

== Accolades ==
"Dumdi Dumdi" managed to achieve a total of 6 music show trophies by August 2020 including double crowns (two consecutive wins) on Show Champion, M Countdown and Inkigayo,

Awards
| Year | Organization | Category | Result | Ref. |
|---|---|---|---|---|
| 2020 | JOOX Hong Kong Top Music Awards | Top 20 K-pop songs | Shortlisted | |
| 2020 | KBS World Radio's 2020 K-Pop Year-End Survey | Song of the Year | Nominated | |
| 2020 | 10th Gaon Chart Music Awards | Song of the Year (August) | Nominated | |
| 2021 | MTV Video Music Awards | Best K-Pop Video | Nominated | |

Music program awards
| Program | Date (6 total) | Ref. |
|---|---|---|
| Show Champion | August 12, 2020 | |
| Show Champion | August 19, 2020 | |
| M Countdown | August 13, 2020 | |
| M Countdown | August 20, 2020 | |
| Inkigayo | August 16, 2020 | |
| Inkigayo | August 23, 2020 | |

== Charts ==
=== Weekly charts ===
| Chart (2020) | Peak position |
|---|---|
| Hungary (Single Top 40) | 15 |
| Singapore (RIAS) | 29 |
| South Korea (Gaon) | 8 |
| South Korea (K-pop Hot 100) | 6 |
| US World Digital Song Sales (Billboard) | 13 |

=== Monthly charts ===
| Chart (2020) | Peak position |
|---|---|
| South Korea (Gaon Digital) | 13 |

=== Year-end chart ===
| Chart (2020) | Peak position |
|---|---|
| South Korea (Gaon Digital) | 90 |

== Release history ==
| Region | Date | Format | Version | Label |
|---|---|---|---|---|
| Various | August 3, 2020 | Digital download; streaming | Original | Cube; Kakao M; U-Cube; Republic |
| China | August 3, 2020 | Digital download; streaming | Chinese | Cube; NetEase music |
| Japan | August 26, 2020 | Digital download; streaming | Japanese | Cube; U-Cube; Universal Japan |
| Various | August 26, 2020 | Digital download; streaming | Japanese | Cube; U-Cube; Universal Japan |

== See also ==
- List of K-pop songs on the Billboard charts
- List of Inkigayo Chart winners (2020)
- List of M Countdown Chart winners (2020)
