= Bird (single album) =

- Digital and streaming cover

Single album by Namjoo
- Released: September 7, 2020
- Studios: 821 Sound; Doobdoob studio
- Genres: K-pop; trap
- Language: Korean
- Label: Play M
- Producers: Soyeon; Big Sancho (Yummy Tone)

Namjoo chronology
Bird (2020)	Bad (2024)

Singles from Bird
- 1. "Bird" Released: September 7, 2020

Bird is a debut solo single album by South Korean singer Namjoo. The single was released on September 7, 2020, by Play M. It is composed by Soyeon and Yummy Tone, and choreographed by Lia Kim of the 1Million Dance Studio, located in Seoul. The song is a trap genre song with an appropriate addition of oriental elements with an autobiographical message that she will not hesitate to fly over everything she loves and dreams.

After 9 years of debut, Namjoo is the third member of Apink to debut solo, after Eunji and Hayoung.

== Background and release ==
On August 18, the Play M agency announced that Apink's Namjoo would be making her solo debut with the single "Bird" on September 7. With this, Namjoo made her solo debut in 9 years as the third runner among Apink members following Eunji and Hayoung. Namjoo revealed the concept of the album is based on the message phrase that says 'birds break out of their eggs' from the book Damien by Hermann Hesse. It contains the message that she wants to be born as a strong woman. Soyeon suggested the title 'Bird' after hearing her concept.

As multiple Korean media outlets said that Namjoo's showed a depicting appearance of overcoming adversity and being reborn as a peacock. With this album, Namjoo showed a shift from Apink style of music and styling such as dark smokey make-up, intense red dress, short and sharp-cut hair, and black and white nail art, saying, "The difference between A Pink Kim Nam-joo and solo singer Kim Nam-joo is the color. If pure white is Apink Kim Nam-joo, black will be able to see the strong and confident solo singer Kim Nam-joo." On September 5, Namjoo went on V Live and talked about how her collaboration with Soyeon came. She revealed that she watched Queendom, and was amazed with Soyeon's producing skills and thought "I want to try working with her."

I was in front of the vending machine in Music Bank. I was just coming out of the bathroom and (G)I-dle's Soyeon was there. I get really shy so I thought, "Should I go up to her? Should I try talking to her?" But I thought it would be best if I talked about this myself, so I went up to Soyeon and asked "Do you produce for other artist as well? I would like to try working with you." And she accepted without hesitation.

— Namjoo, V Live

Namjoo explained why she didn't include the tracks for her album because she wanted to focus only on one song. "The fans are sad, but I hope they don't feel sorry for me because I chose it."

== Packaging ==
The album preview was revealed for pre-order from August 31, a week exactly from the official release. The package is hard case and consists of a photo book, a CD, eight photo cards, six postcards and three posters.

== Music and composition ==
Bird contains the autobiographical message of Namjoo that she will fly without hesitation for everything she loves and dreams. The debut single was co-written and co-produced by (G)I-dle's Soyeon with Yummy Tone. It is a trap genre song with an appropriate addition of oriental elements, with addictive sound and bold lyrics.

== Commercial performance ==
=== Single ===
"Bird" entered major music charts such as Melon, Genie, Bugs, Soribada right after the release of her first single album Bird at 6 pm.

== Track listing ==
Digital download
No.	Title	Lyrics	Music	Arrangement	Length
1.	"Bird"	Soyeon	Soyeon; Big Sancho (Yummy Tone)	Big Sancho (Yummy Tone); Soyeon
2.	"Bird" (Inst.)		Soyeon; Big Sancho (Yummy Tone)	Big Sancho (Yummy Tone); Soyeon

== Credits and personnel ==
Credits are adapted from Melon.

- Namjoo – primary vocals
- Soyeon of (G)I-dle – producing, songwriting, arranger,
- Big Sancho (Yummy Tone) – producing, arranger, keyboard
- Kim Young-hyun – guitar
- Jeon Jae-hee – background vocal
- Kim Min-hee (821 Sound) – recording
- Kwon Yoo-jin (doobdoob Studio) – recording
- Jang Woo-young (doobdoob Studio) – recording
- Jeon Jeon (Cube Studio) – digital editor
- Jongpil Gu (KLANG STUDIO) – mixing
- Kang Sun-young – mixing engineer
- Kwon Nam-woo (821 Sound mastering) – mastering

== Promotions ==
The first promotional teaser poster for the single was released on August 24. On August 28, the track information image of the first single album Bird was released. In the image, the phrase "I'm gonna be free like a bird" symbolizes the whole concept of the album. Starting from August 29 to September 1, the agency PlayM released three concept teasers; Restrained, Resist and Reborn. The following day, a 17-second pre-performance video which was choreographed by Lia Kim was released.

On September 7, Namjoo held a global fan showcase broadcast live online at 8 pm KST through Naver V Live before the song's digital release, hosted by Apink's leader Park Cho-rong.

== Music video ==
Prior to its release, the song was accompanied by a 35-second music video teaser released midnight KST on September 4, 2020.

On September 7, "Bird" was released along with its music video. Choreography for the song was created by Lia Kim, who was formerly Namjoo's teacher at a dance academy and now a chief choreographer of the 1Million Dance Studio.

== Charts ==
=== Album ===
Weekly sales chart performance for Bird
Chart (2020)	Peak position
South Korean Albums (Gaon)	8

Monthly sales chart performance for Bird
Chart (2020)	Peak position
South Korea (Gaon Album Chart)	43

=== Song ===
Weekly sales chart performance for Bird
Chart (2020)	Peak position
South Korea (Gaon Download)	73

== Certifications and sales ==
Region	Certification	Certified units/sales
South Korea	—	9,061
