= Kim Nam-joo (singer) =

South Korean singer (born 1995)

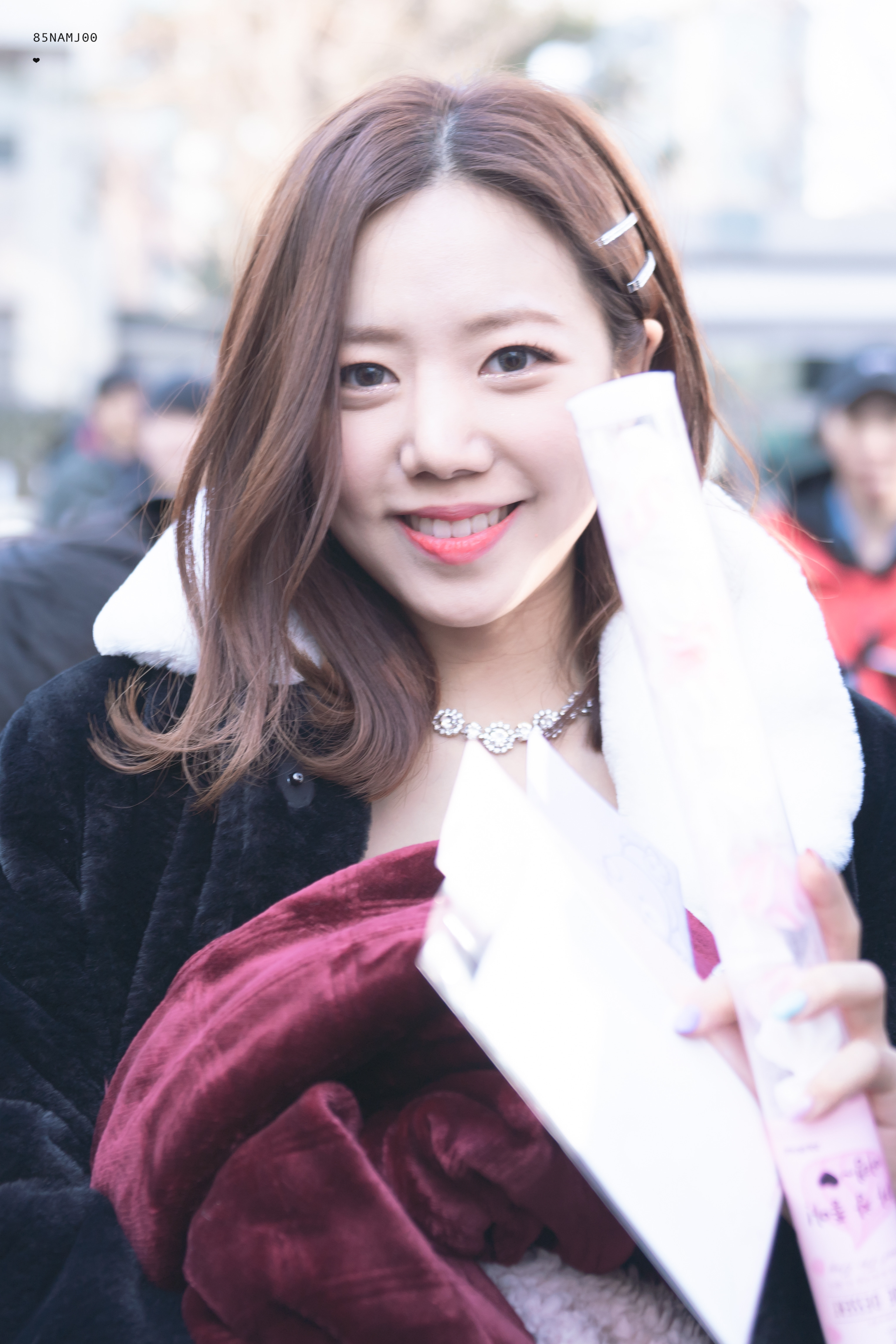
- Kim in 2019
- Born: Kim Nam-joo; April 15, 1995 (age 30); Seoul, South Korea
- Education: Sungkyunkwan University
- Occupations: Singer; actress
- Musical career
- Genres: K-pop
- Instrument: Vocals
- Years active: 2003–2008; 2011–present
- Labels: IST; Choi Creative Lab; With Us Entertainment
- Member of: Apink

Korean name
- Hangul: 김남주
- RR: Gim Namju
- MR: Kim Namju

Kim Nam-joo (Korean: 김남주; born April 15, 1995), also known mononymously as Namjoo, is a South Korean singer and actress. She is a member of the South Korean girl group Apink. She made her solo debut on September 7, 2020, with her first single album Bird.

== Career ==
=== Pre-debut ===
Before debuting with Apink, she starred in a 2003 LG Electronics commercial at 6, and in 2007 TV commercial at age 13.

=== 2011–present: Apink ===
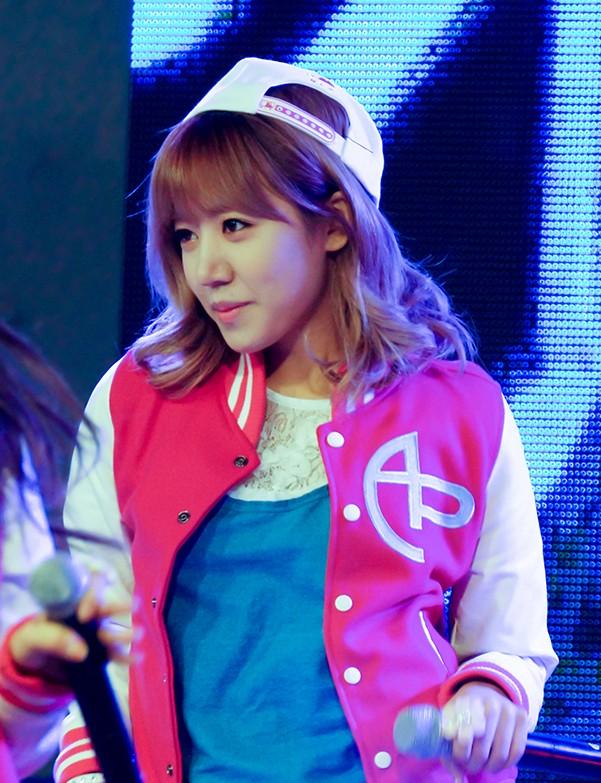
Kim performing in October 2013

Kim joined Cube Entertainment through the 2010 Cube Party auditions, subsequently transferring to its then-independent label A Cube Entertainment (now IST Entertainment), and was one of the last Apink members to be introduced before the group's debut. Kim debuted with Apink on Mnet's M! Countdown performing their songs "I Don't Know" (몰라요; lit. 'Mollayo') and "Wishlist" which were included on their debut EP Seven Springs of Apink on April 21, 2011. She is also one of the two members of Apink's sub-unit PINK BnN along with Yoon Bo-mi.

On April 28, 2023, IST Entertainment announced that Kim did not renew her contract with the company but will still be part of the group. On the same day, Kim signed an exclusive contract with Choi Creative Lab.

=== 2015–present: Solo activities ===
In September 2015, she was cast in Naver TV's 8-episode web series Investigator Alice, where she portrayed detective Chun Yeon-joo. She reprised her role in its second season, in 2016.

In March 2015, Kim joined MBC's Tutoring Across Generations in place of Lee Tae-im, but the show got cancelled on April 2 after episode 21 due to falling ratings. Kim with fellow member Yoon Bo-mi appeared on Sugar Man as PINK BnN on October 20, 2015. In 2016, Kim and Apink co-member Yoon Bo-mi became the new MCs of Shikshin Road 2. In the December 27 broadcast of King of Mask Singer, it was revealed that Kim was behind the mask "Good Daughter Shim Cheong".

Between 2017 and 2018, Kim played the role of detective Oh Jin-kyung in Naver TV's Bad Boy Detectives, once again collaborating with the team behind Investigator Alice.

In October 2017, Kim was cast in the lead role of Juliet Capulet in Sungkyunkwan University's production of Romeo and Juliet.

On September 7, 2020, Kim made her solo debut with her first single album Bird.

On May 24, 2022, musical producer Shinswave announced that Kim would be making her musical debut with popular stage show, Midnight Sun, as the female lead. To promote the musical, she collaborated with stage member, Onew, to release "A Melody Called You" (너라는 멜로디), as well as the solo song, "Will Such A Day Come? (그런 날이 오게 될까?)".

== Other works ==
Kim alongside groupmate Jung Eun-ji and Jang Hyun-seung, former member of Beast, released the single "A Year Ago" from the project A Cube For Season #White on January 3, 2013, to commemorate the success of their respective groups.

In 2014, she performed "Seoul Lonely" with the hip-hop trio Phantom on several music programs.

On June 2, 2015, she released a duet with BtoB's Yook Sung-jae entitled "Photograph", as part of Cube Entertainment's project single album A Cube For Season #Blue Season 2.

== Personal life ==
Kim attended Seoul Performing Arts High School along with fellow Apink members Son Na-eun, Oh Ha-young, and former member Hong Yoo-kyung. She graduated in February 2014. In 2015, Kim was accepted to Sungkyunkwan University's Department of Performance Arts.

== Discography ==
=== Single albums ===
List of extended plays, with selected chart positions and sales
Title	Details	Peak chart positions	Sales
Title	Details	KOR	Sales
Bird	Released: September 7, 2020; Label: Play M Entertainment; Formats: CD, digital download	8	KOR: 9,061
Bad	Released: March 18, 2024; Label: Choi Creative Lab; Formats: CD, digital download	14	KOR: 10,409

=== Singles ===
Title	Year	Peak chart positions	Sales	Album
Title	Year	KOR	Sales	Album
As lead artist
"Bird"	2020	— (Note: "Bird" did not enter Gaon Digital Chart, but debuted and peaked at number 73 on Gaon Download Chart.)	—N/a	Bird
"Bad"	2024	—	—N/a	Bad
Collaborations
"A Year Ago" (with Eunji and Jang Hyun-seung)	2013	13	KOR: 300,616+	Acube For Season #White
"Photograph" (with Yook Sung-jae)	2015	29	KOR: 115,083	Acube For Season #Blue
As featured artist
"Sweet Now" (Damiano feat. Namjoo)	2015	—	—N/a	Dalda
Soundtrack appearances
"The Magic"	2015	—	—N/a	Tom Little and The Magic Mirror OST
"Our Night is More Beautiful Than Your Day" (우리의 밤은 당신의 낮보다 아름답다) (with Bomi, LE, Chaeyeon, Seo In-young, Lee Seok-hoon, ₩uNo, Yang Da-il, Brother Su, Chancellor, Kang Min-hee)	2017	89	KOR: 28,346+	Merry Summer
"I Pray 4 You" (with Bomi)	2017	–	—N/a	School 2017 OST
"Shake" (with Defconn)	2017	—	—N/a	Deep OST
"Stay With Me" (feat. PULLIK)	2019	—	—N/a	I Wanna Hear Your Song OST
"—" denotes releases that did not chart or were not released in that region.

== Videography ==
=== Music videos ===
Year	Title	Director	Ref.
2020	"Bird"	Minjun Lee, Hayoung Lee (MOSWANTD)	
2020	"Bird" (Special Video)	KOINRUSH	
2024	"Bad"	88 Gymnastic Heroes (KEEPUSWEIRD)	

== Filmography ==
=== Web series ===
Year	Title	Role	Notes	Ref.
2015–2016	Investigator Alice	Chun Yeon-joo	Lead role; 2 seasons	
2017–2018	Bad Boys Detective	Oh Jin-kyung	Lead role; 2 seasons	

=== Television shows ===
Year	Title	Role	Ref.
2016	Shikshin Road 2	Co-host	
2017	The Show Fan PD	Co-host	
2022	Because It's My First New House	Host	

== Musical theatre ==
Year	Title	Role	Ref.
2017	Romeo and Juliet	Juliet Capulet	
2022	Midnight Sun	Hannah	
