= Soyeon =

South Korean rapper (born 1998)

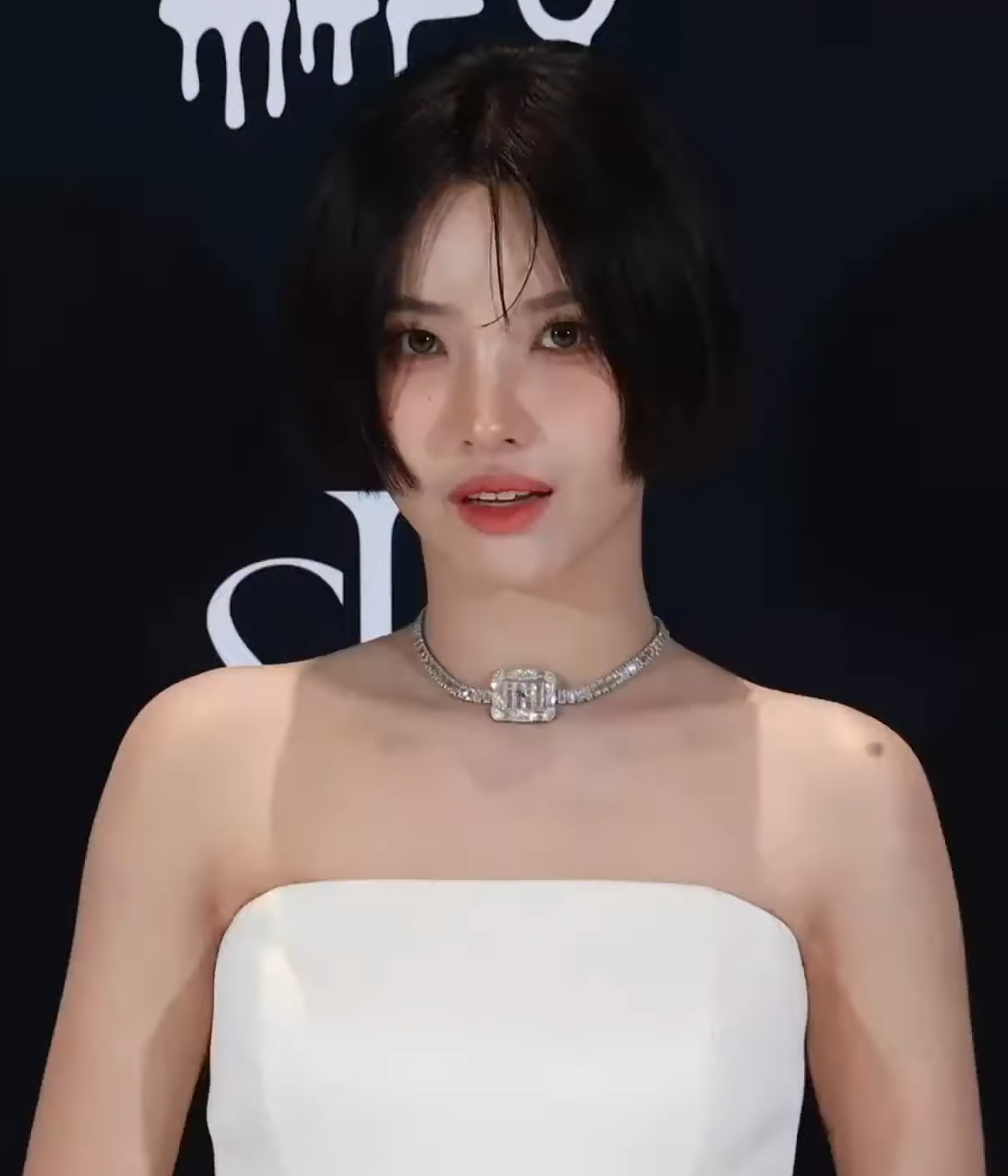
- Soyeon in 2025
- Born: Jeon So-yeon; August 26, 1998 (age 28); Seoul, South Korea
- Education: Chung-Ang University
- Occupations: Rapper; singer; songwriter; record producer
- Musical career
- Genres: K-pop; hip hop; pop-rock
- Years active: 2016–present
- Label: Cube
- Member of: I-dle; K/DA; True Damage; United Cube

Korean name
- Hangul: 전소연
- RR: Jeon Soyeon
- MR: Chŏn Soyŏn

Jeon So-yeon (Korean: 전소연; born August 26, 1998), known mononymously as Soyeon, is a South Korean rapper, singer, songwriter and record producer, under Cube Entertainment. She first gained attention for competing in the television shows Produce 101 and Unpretty Rapstar before debuting as a solo artist on November 5, 2017. On May 2, 2018, she debuted as the leader and rapper of the K-pop girl group (G)I-dle, later changing their name to I-dle, for whom she has written and produced most lead singles.

In 2018, she joined SM Station X's girl group project Station Young, which released its debut song "Wow Thing" in September of that year. She has also portrayed the League of Legends character Akali in the virtual musical groups K/DA and True Damage.

Soyeon was promoted to a full member of the Korea Music Copyright Association on January 31, 2024.

== Early life ==
Jeon So-yeon was born on August 26, 1998, in Gaepo-dong, Gangnam District, Seoul. As a child, she attended a Buddhist kindergarten, before being homeschooled and later enrolling in Kuryong Elementary School. During her time there, she immersed herself in ballet, entering and winning numerous competitions. She quit to pursue a career in music after seeing Big Bang perform; Soyeon secretly attended and failed around 20 to 30 singing auditions. Soyeon later decided to pursue rapping, and received interested calls. With the interested parties' direction of music being different from hers, she let go of her dream of becoming a singer and picked up dancing again. It was then that she began performing as a street dancer. After seeing Cube Entertainment's 2014 audition poster, Soyeon decided to attend the Incheon auditions and became a trainee at the company. She continued her journey, managing both her training schedule and education, and in February, 2017, she graduated from Chung-Ang University.

== Career ==
=== 2016–2017: Produce 101, Unpretty Rapstar and solo debut ===
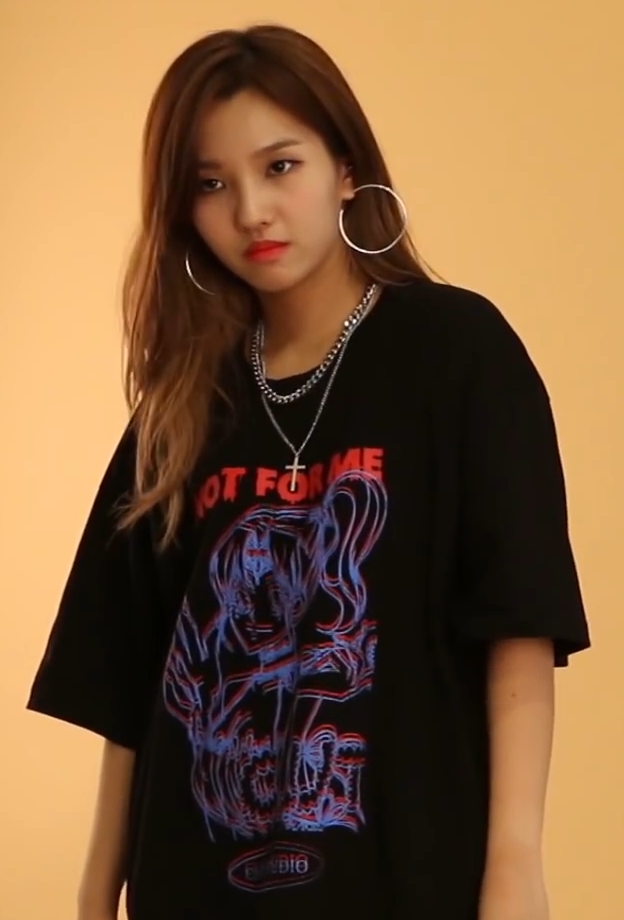
Soyeon during Unpretty Rapstar 3 in 2016.

In January 2016, Soyeon appeared as a representative trainee for Cube Entertainment in the first season of the girl group talent competition show Produce 101. She remained a popular contestant throughout the show's run, peaking at 10th place on the fifth episode. However, she ranked at number 20 on the last episode and failed to become a member of the winning project girl group, I.O.I.

In July 2016, Soyeon appeared as a contestant in the third season of the rap competition show Unpretty Rapstar. she finished the show as the second runner-up, and three of her tracks were included on the show's final compilation album.

On December 29, 2016, Soyeon signed an exclusive contract as an artist under Cube Entertainment. She officially debuted on November 5, 2017, with the digital singles "Jelly" and "Idle Song", which she wrote.

=== 2018–2020: Debut with (G)I-dle, collaborations with League of Legends and solo activities ===
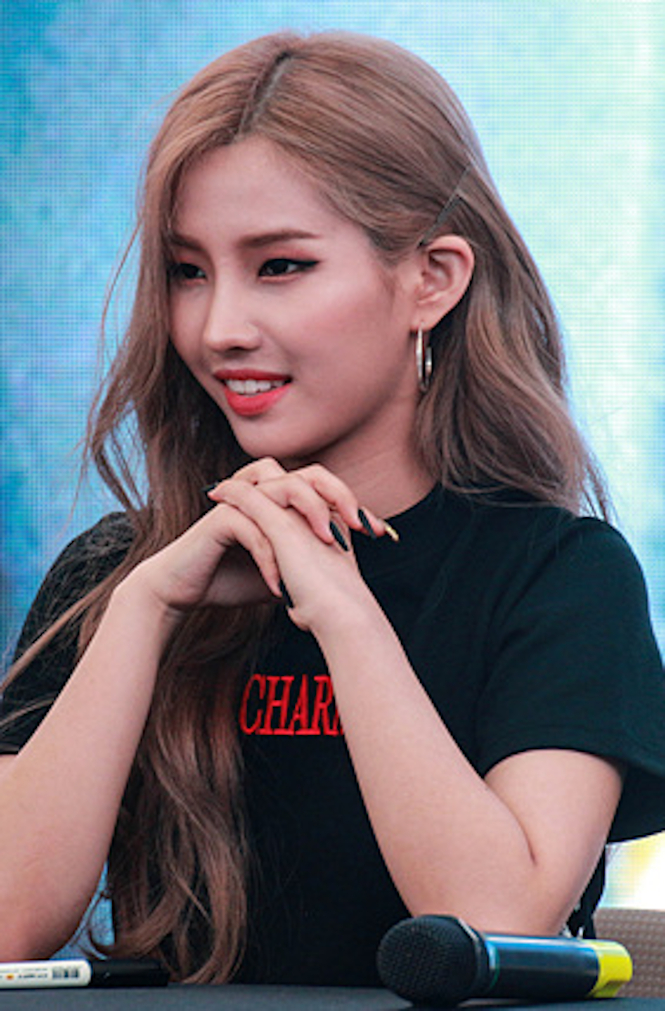
Soyeon at a fan sign during "Latata" promotions in 2018.

On January 11, 2018, it was announced that Soyeon would be re-debuting in Cube Entertainment's new girl group (G)I-dle, as a rapper and its leader. She was credited in writing the lyrics, music and arrangement for both their debut song "Latata" and their next single "Hann (Alone)", both of which were well received and commercially successful. She also helped write five songs from (G)I-dle's debut extended play I Am.

On August 8, 2018, it was announced that Soyeon would participate in a girl group project called Station Young for SM Station's X 0 alongside Red Velvet's Seulgi, Kim Chung-ha, and GFriend's SinB. Station Young released their first song, "Wow Thing", on September 28, 2018.

After their debut, Soyeon and fellow (G)I-dle member Miyeon were approached by Riot Games to collaborate with American artists Jaira Burns and Madison Beer as part of the virtual girl group K/DA for the multiplayer online battle arena video game League of Legends where she sang for as the character Akali. K/DA officially debuted with the song "Pop/Stars" during the 2018 League of Legends World Championship on November 3. The official music video for "Pop/Stars" was released on the same day, reaching 30 million views on YouTube in five days, and 100 million in one month. The single release of the song reached number one on Billboard's World Digital Songs chart. Her incarnation as Akali is additionally a subject of cosplay amongst fans of both K/DA and League of Legends.

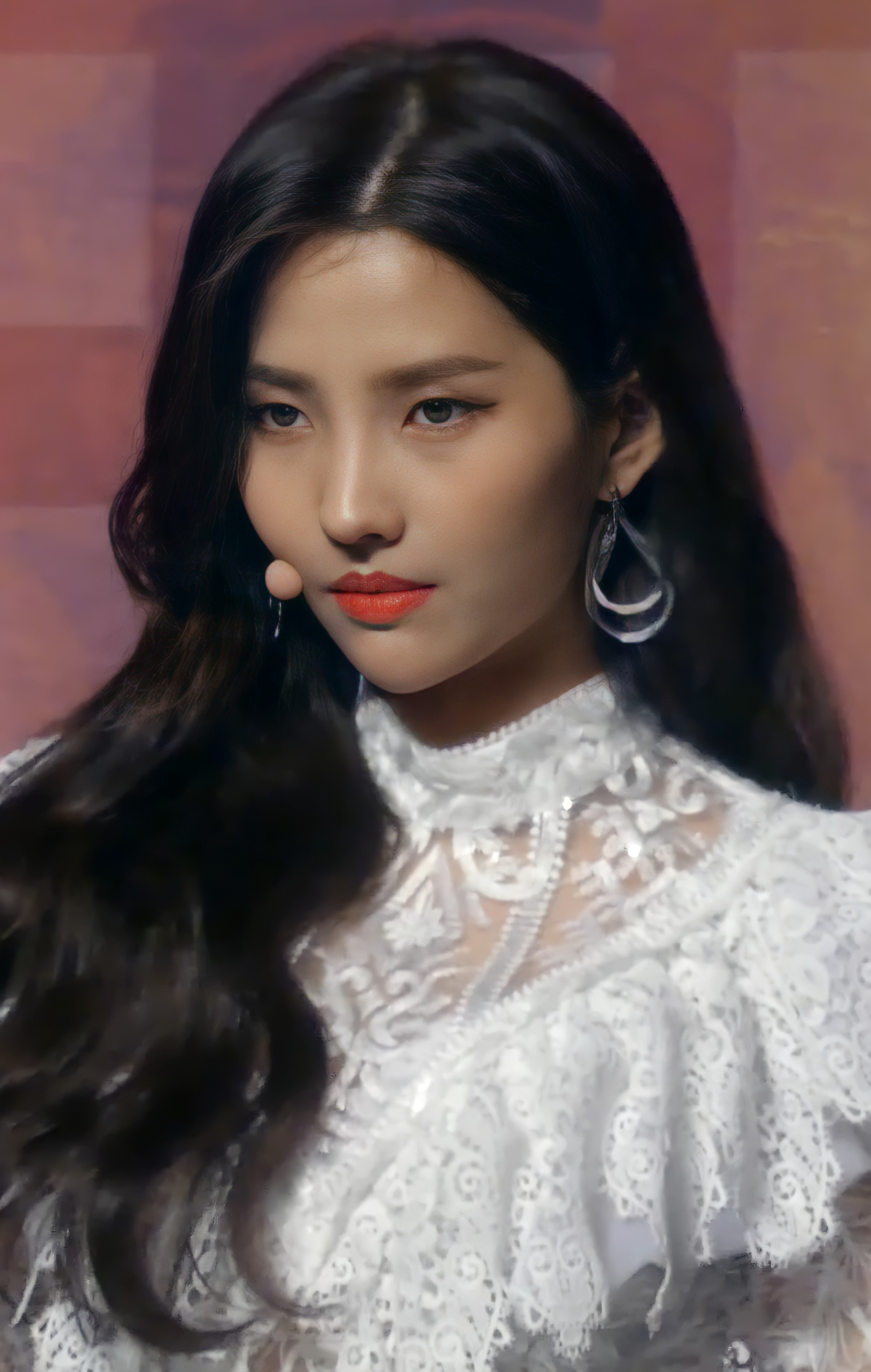
Soyeon at the I Made showcase in February 2019.

In 2019, Soyeon composed labelmate CLC's "No", which was selected through a blind test and served as the lead single of the group's EP No. 1. In March 2019, Soyeon made a public apology for using a pirated version of the German music-producing software Kontakt. She wrote on her online fan community site, "I deeply regret that I used an illegal copy of the program; as far as I remember, I used it when I first learned songwriting. I had not even recognized that I did not delete the program. But since the day I began composing in earnest, I have only used authorized programs". The apology came days after a behind-the-scenes YouTube video of preparing the I Made EP, produced by the agency, showed icons of the software's illegal copy on her laptop screen. The agency later deleted the video and apologized.

Soyeon reprised her role as Akali in the League of Legends collaborative hip hop group True Damage. A collaboration with Becky G, Keke Palmer, Thutmose and Duckwrth titled "Giants" was released as a single alongside an animated music video on November 10, 2019. The song is a multilingual track performed predominantly in English, with verses in Spanish and Korean. On the same day, the group performed at the 2019 League of Legends World Championship finals in Paris, France. It was Soyeon's second year in a row to perform at the opening ceremony of the World Championship finals. "Giants" debuted at number fifteen and nineteen at Billboard's Rap and R&B/Hip hop Digital Songs Sales charts, respectively.

In 2020, Soyeon guested on Mnet's hip hop-inspired show Do You Know Hip Hop, collaborating with Double K and Nuck to perform a remix of "Lion". In April, (G)I-dle released their third EP, I Trust. All of the songs on the album, including the lead single "Oh My God", was written and composed by Soyeon and longtime collaborator Yummy Tone. The lead single was released in both English and Korean. On July 22, Soyeon helped write and featured on DJ Hyo's "Dessert" with rapper Loopy, a jungle pop song with "bouncy" beat and moombahton rhythm, synthesizer-based hook, claps and whistles, and lyrics expressing desire for a sweet love rather than a difficult and complex one. In an interview with Melon, DJ Hyo revealed that she chose Soyeon as a collaborator because of her talents. In August, Soyeon composed (G)I-dle's first summer song, "Dumdi Dumdi", alongside Pop Time, who had previously produced songs for rapper Zico and the boy band Block B.

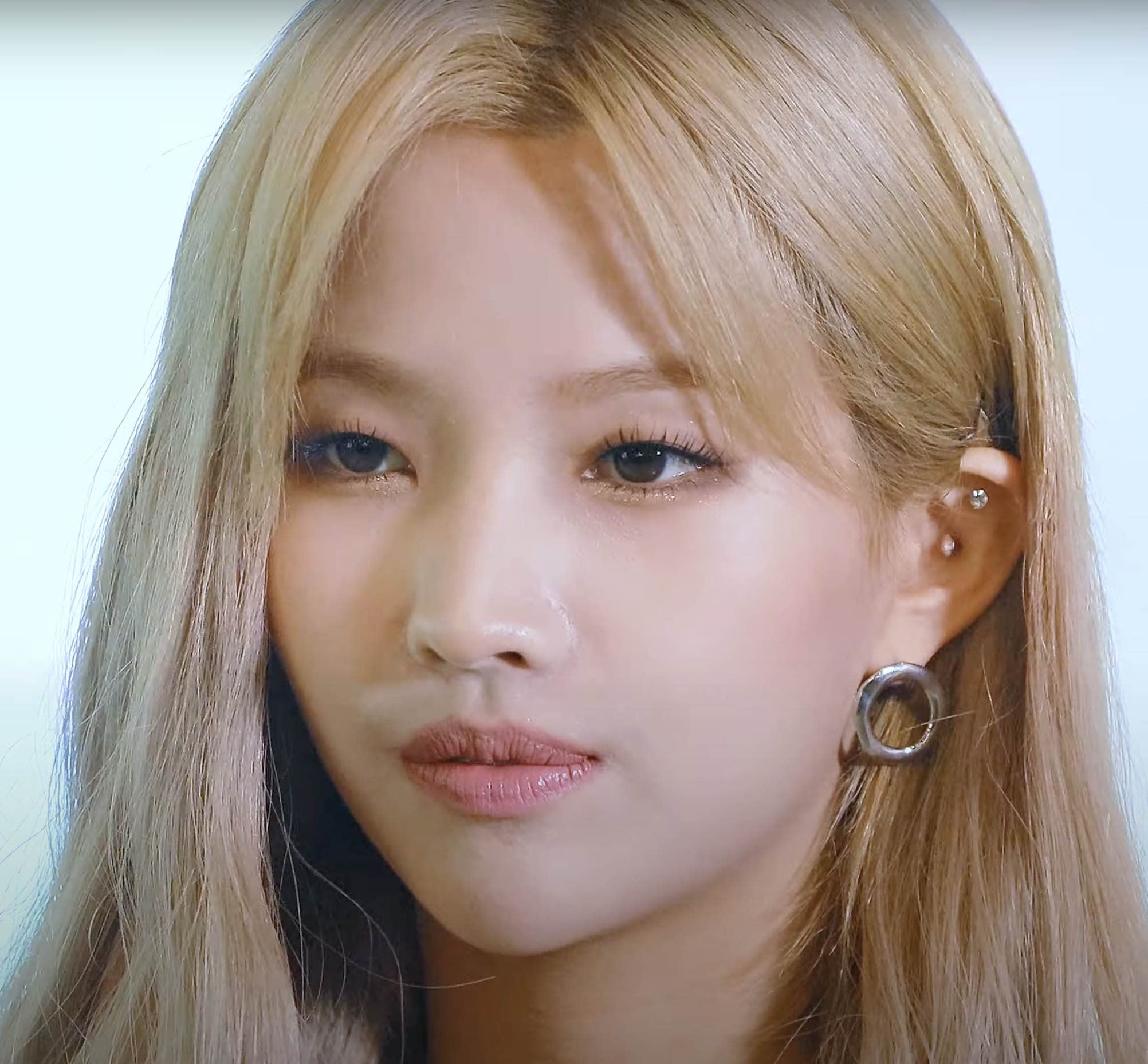
Soyeon during promotions for "Dumdi Dumdi" in 2020.

On August 27, 2020, Soyeon reprised her role as League of Legends character Akali in "The Baddest" and "More", on K/DA's EP All Out. Soyeon was credited as the producer of Apink's Namjoo solo debut song "Bird", which was released on September 7. On December 16, it was confirmed that Soyeon, Pentagon's Hui, and AB6IX's Lee Dae-hwi would produce songs for the top seven competition on Mnet's audition show CAP-TEEN. Her song, "Eternal Sunshine", was performed by Lee Seo-bin. It was characterized as having "a groovy" guitar and bass rhythm with lyrics expressing the feelings of a first love. Lee received overall positive reviews and a total score of 354 from the judges for the performance.

=== 2021–present: First solo EP Windy and first studio album What a Wonderful Life ===
In January 2021, (G)I-dle released their EP I Burn, including the lead single "Hwaa"; Soyeon wrote four of the six tracks. The same month, Soyeon appeared on Face ID, a KakaoTV original entertainment show revealing the everyday lifestyle of celebrities through their phones, which aired every Monday for three weeks from January 25. In the episodes, she revealed the production process of many of her songs, daily lives with (G)I-dle members, 1,600 demo songs, and behind-the-scenes video from the preparation of I Burn to the day of its release. On May 21, it was reported that Soyeon would be releasing a solo album. On June 16, Cube Entertainment announced that her first EP, Windy, would be released on July 5, with "Beam Beam" serving as the lead single. Soyeon won her first music program trophy on SBS MTV's The Show on July 13.

On August 23, 2023, Soyeon collaborated with LG Uplus and a music video was released titled "I'm Okay" (아무너케), which garnered more than 9 million views on YouTube in a week. On November 9, it was confirmed that Soyeon would be part of a special collaboration single "Nobody" with Ive's Liz and Aespa's Winter, which was released on November 16.

On February 20, 2024, Soyeon, along with Yena, was featured in the music video of "Sugar Rush" by Bibi. Soyeon then wrote and participated in composing the title track for QWER's second EP Algorithm's Blossom, titled "My Name Is Malguem" (내이름 맑음), released on September 23, which secured the first music show win for the band.

On August 22, 2026, Soyeon revealed a new song "Star" during her performance at Waterbomb Sokcho. The song was confirmed to be part of her first studio album What a Wonderful Life (끝내주는 인생), which was released on September 7, and led by the single "I'm Gonna Toesa" (퇴사할게여) that includes a narration by South Korean entertainer Kian84.

== Artistry ==
=== Influences ===
Soyeon stated that her bandmates are her primary songwriting inspirations. She was additionally heavily influenced by her rap teacher in high school, who Soyeon recalled "taught [her] the basics like how to write good lyrics and how to melt in your sincerity". She also named CL, Britney Spears and Avril Lavigne as her role models with the latter two being the inspiration behind I Never Die's concept and fashion.

Soyeon's songs are also inspired by cartoons, books and dramas. "Idle Song" was created because she was inspired by the SpongeBob SquarePants theme song. "Latata" was inspired by Song Joon-geun's catchphrase "arata rata rata" in KBS2's Gag Concert. "Hann (Alone)" was inspired by Kim Sowol's poem "Azaleas". "Senorita" was inspired by Spanish song, "Despacito" (2017). "Uh-Oh" was inspired by the expression and the tone used by staff, where she'd shot a reality show, To Neverland in the U.S. "Lion" was inspired from live-action The Lion King during her group's debut in Japan.

For I Trust album concept, Soyeon revealed that she got inspired by watching an isekai anime, KonoSuba: God's Blessing on this Wonderful World! Legend of Crimson, and "Luv U" was created and choreographed from the scene heart-finger V by the animation Sugar Sugar Rune. "Dumdi Dumdi" was inspired by the 2016 Disney's Zootopia. The inspiration for "Hwaa" came to Soyeon when Shuhua once said 'winter girl' in a conversation. She took the idea and created the concept of a woman trapped in winter.

For I Never Die, Soyeon compared the album with the Marineford war in One Piece anime series – "the war is a very important event in One Piece. The story revolves around the members who have grown up two years after fighting a war that they thought was an insurmountable crisis and like the members are separated to grow up. Like the manga, I thought I Never Die is an album that depicts (G)I-dle after the war. This album, which is represented by growth and shock, was perfected with passion and fierceness". "Tomboy" was inspired by the fictional character, Cruella de Vil.

"If we had done music that taught and gave lessons before, this time we wanted to express the songs [message] with a light and comical point along with the motif of the movie I Feel Pretty.

— Soyeon explaining the art direction of the album, Electronic Times.

Before the release of I Love, Soyeon appeared in episode 445 of I Live Alone where she was seen leading a meeting for the next album in which she said "I have a message I want to convey", that "It's better to be hated as I am than to be loved as I am not". She stated that she was inspired by late actress Marilyn Monroe for the next album concept. "I want to break the prejudice of 'sexy'. You can think of it as a metaphorical expression that 'even if I am loved by you again, I will (still) be me'", she added.

Soyeon noted in the press release for the album I Feel, that she was inspired by the 2018 movie I Feel Pretty and the subject revolves around conveying a message about self-esteem and confidence.

=== Songwriting and musical style ===
Although Soyeon trained in songwriting classes before her debut, she states that she never intended to be (G)I-dle's primary songwriter, instead taking on the role out of necessity: "At first, I really didn't know I'd be writing these songs ... but our debut was getting delayed because we didn't have a song. So that's when I thought, I should write our song, and started writing a title track". She described her composition process as starting with writing melodies on a blank page with just a piano or a beat, noting that "it is common to have a track maker, someone who writes melodies and putting a melody on a mostly completed beat". In the production of the group's debut song "Latata", Soyeon began with moombahton beats and simple instruments such as percussion, putting them on loop and coated them with melody. She considers her bandmates while writing and tries to avoid the lyrics involving "me" or "I". Soyeon further emphasized the importance of appealing to emotions to "mak[e] music without prejudice ... I think it's the music that anyone can sympathize with. Our group is multinational and has no language barrier".

For (G)I-dle's first preliminary performance on the competition show Queendom, Soyeon proposed a sorceress concept for "Latata", an arrangement that IZM praised as "an entirely original song". According to the magazine, her consistent confidence in her group, song and herself both on and offstage is because "she has a clear image of what she wants to create". Poet Seo Hyo-in wrote that Soyeon "covers all aspects of producing, from composition and writing, rap making and setting the concept" but "doesn't overshadow the other members". She praised Soyeon for maximizing the strengths of each member, allowing them to find their own artistic freedom.

==== Gender stereotypes in music ====
"All stereotypes must be crushed. The stereotype that you're too young to do something. The stereotype that limits female idols. Music has no gender."

— Soyeon, 2019

Soyeon expressed her desire for more women to take part in record production, believing that there are no gender boundaries when it comes to arts forms like music, performances and gaming. She stated, "When I write, I don't think about gender. No 'we're a girl group', women, men or age. I just write what's on my mind". In June 2020 interview with MTV, on using the pronoun "she" in "Oh My God", Soyeon remarked that she "didn't want to limit that 'she' to a certain being or a certain definition, so it's open to anything" and that "all kinds of love are valuable and must be respected".

== Image and impact ==
Media outlets have labelled Soyeon a versatile artist, "triple threat", and Alpha girl due to her success as a rapper, singer, and songwriter and skills in record production and dancing. Cube Entertainment noted that Soyeon's presence in (G)I-dle was vital to the group's popularity and helped set them apart from their peers. Also nicknamed "survival born monster", stemming from her appearance on multiple survival shows, she has established herself as a next-generation "producer-dol". RBW's Cosmic Sound (Kim Ki-hyun) and Cosmic Girl (former Rania member Yoo Joo-yi) described Soyeon as a "genius songwriter-idol", and Kukinews named her the first successful female Korean idol singer who also produces music for both her group and other artists. Journalist Park Eun-hae dubbed Soyeon the Korean Lady Gaga due to her small figure; courage to try challenging concepts without genre limitations; and unique position in the Korean entertainment industry as a writer, producer, and performer. She is currently taking charge of the girl group Baby Dont Cry's creative direction and music production.

Soyeon has been regarded as a role model for young women. Various artists cited her as an inspiration, including Majors' Aki, ANS' Dalyn, Woo!ah!'s Songyee, Craxy's KaRin Lightsum's Jian and Juhyeon, Lunarsolar's Eseo, H1-Key's Hwiseo, Blank2y's Siwoo, Adya's Sena,and Purple Kiss' Yuki. South Korean producer and songwriter Ryan S. Jhun expressed his admiration for the competition Queendom, on which (G)I-dle appeared, and shared that he hopes to work with Soyeon one day.

During the recording of "My Name Is Malguem" (내이름 맑음), QWER member Hina recalled, "Since my voice has a lot of nasal sounds, she told me, 'Sound like a man, don't be shy, and try your best.' I was very moved by Soyeon's consideration during the whole recording process, and I think my vocal range has broadened thanks to this experience".

== Philanthropy ==
In April 2020, Soyeon donated 30,000 hand sanitizers during the COVID-19 pandemic in South Korea through the Holt Children's Welfare Association.

On June 2, 2021, Soyeon opened a personal Instagram account with several photos of selfies and an arm tattoo. Later, Soyeon revealed the tattoo was a "consent for organ donation" tattoo on V Live. She stated, "I saw an article saying that an average of 5 people a day died waiting for an organ donor. I thought about what I could do for others in my life, and then I came to a conclusion. It was a decision I made after cautiously thinking".

On January 18, 2022, Soyeon donated 20,000 briquettes to the Sharing Briquettes of Love campaign to help those in need, including unprivileged and low-income families, throughout the cold winter.

In February 2023, Soyeon donated ₩20 million to the Hope Bridge National Disaster Relief Association in order to aid those affected by the 2023 Turkey–Syria earthquake.

On July 17, 2024, Soyeon donated ₩100 million to the Hope Bridge National Disaster Relief Association, as a member of Hope Bridge Honors Club, to help recover from heavy rain damage across South Korea. She stated, "I participated in the donation with the hope that it would be a small comfort to those affected by this heavy rain".

On March 28, 2025, Soyeon delivered another ₩100 million in donations to the same foundation, Hope Bridge National Disaster Relief Association, to support for residents in areas affected by forest fires such as Ulsan, Gyeongbuk, Gyeongnam and temporary shelters. A statement was issued where she stated, "I wanted to convey even a little comfort. I sincerely hope that those who are suffering will return to their daily lives as soon as possible", she added, "I think it's time for all of us to reach out".

== Discography ==
=== Studio albums ===
List of studio albums, showing selected details
Title	Details	Peak chart positions		Sales
Title	Details	KOR	JPN	Sales
What a Wonderful Life (끝내주는 인생)	Released: September 7, 2026; Label: Cube Entertainment; Formats: CD, digital download, streaming; Track listing: 1. "I'm Gonna Toesa" (퇴사할게여) (featuring Kian84); 2. "Bankroll"; 3. "Icebluerabbit"; 4. "Star"; 5. "Hate Veggie Song" (야채 싫어 송); 6. "Amigo" (featuring Minsu); 7. "Would You Love Me" (그냥 사랑하면 안 될까); 8. "Goodbye, Romance" (낭만 보내기)	5	31	KOR: 82,867; JPN: 1,786

=== Extended plays ===
List of extended plays, showing selected details, selected chart positions, and sales figures
Title	Details	Peak chart positions	Sales
Title	Details	KOR	Sales
Windy	Released: July 5, 2021; Label: Cube Entertainment, Republic; Formats: CD, digital download, streaming	7	KOR: 38,717

=== Singles ===
List of singles, showing year released, selected chart positions, sales figures, and name of the album
Title	Year	Peak chart positions					Sales	Album
Title	Year	KOR Circle	KOR Hot	TWN	US World	WW Excl. US	Sales	Album
As lead artist
"Children's Day" (어린이의 하루) (featuring Superbee)	2016	—	—	—	—	—	—N/a	Unpretty Rapstar 3
"Smile" (웃어) (featuring Davii)	2016	—	—	—	—	—	—N/a	Unpretty Rapstar 3
"Jelly"	2017	—	—	—	—	—	—N/a	Non-album singles
"Idle Song" (아이들 쏭)	2018	—	—	—	—	—	—N/a	Non-album singles
"Beam Beam" (삠삠)	2021	115	71	—	—	—	—N/a	Windy
"I'm OK" (아무너케)	2023	—	—	—	—	—	—N/a	Non-album singles
"My Name Is Malguem" (Note: Cover of QWER's song at The Seasons: Park Bo-gum's Cantabile.)	2025	—	—	—	—	—	—N/a	Non-album singles
"I'm Gonna Toesa" (퇴사할게여) (featuring Kian84)	2026	1	—	2	—	149	—N/a	What a Wonderful Life
Collaborations
"She's Coming" (with Grace, Nada, Miryo, Euna Kim, Yuk Ji-dam, Giant Pink, Janey, Kassy, Ha Ju-yeon)	2016	92	—	—	—	—	KOR: 16,756	Unpretty Rapstar 3
"Scary" (with Nada)	2016	29	—	—	—	—	KOR: 65,910	Unpretty Rapstar 3
"Mermaid" (with Lee Min-hyuk, Peniel, Jung Il-hoon, Jang Ye-eun, and Wooseok)	2018	—	—	—	—	—	—N/a	One
"Wow Thing" (with Seulgi, SinB, and Chungha)	2018	35	43	—	3	—	—N/a	SM Station X 0
"New Vision" (with Colde)	2021	—	—	—	—	—	—N/a	New Vision
"The Ball Is Round" (with Code Kunst, Woo Won-jae)	2022	—	—	—	—	—	—N/a	Non-album singles
"Nobody" (with Winter (Aespa), Liz (Ive))	2023	— (Note: "Nobody" did not enter the Circle Digital Chart, but peaked at number 11 on the Circle Download Chart.)	—	—	—	—	—N/a	Non-album singles
As featured artist
"Hang Out" (너도? 나도!) (Lee Min-hyuk featuring Soyeon)	2019	—	—	—	—	—	—N/a	Hutazone
"I Wanna Be" (Key featuring Soyeon)	2019	122	—	—	13	—	—N/a	I Wanna Be
"Giants" (True Damage featuring Soyeon, Becky G, Keke Palmer, Thutmose and Duckwrth)	2019	—	—	—	— (Note: "Giants" but peaked at number 15 on the Billboard Rap Chart.)	—	—N/a	Non-album single
"Dessert" (Hyoyeon featuring Loopy and Soyeon)	2020	— (Note: "Dessert" did not enter Gaon Digital Chart, but peaked at number 166 on the Gaon Download Chart.)	96	—	16	—	—N/a	Deep
"Ani" (애니) (Ravi featuring Soyeon)	2021	—	—	—	—	—	—N/a	Love&Fight
"Damdadi" (R.Tee featuring Soyeon)	2025	—	—	—	—	—	—N/a	Non-album singles
"Don't Die" (Odetari featuring Soyeon)	2026	—	—	—	—	—	—N/a	Non-album singles
"Know My Name" (True Damage featuring Sofía Reyes, Coco Jones, Vic Mensa, Soyeon)	2026	—	—	—	—	—	—N/a	Non-album singles
Soundtrack appearances
"Freak Show"	2022	— (Note: "Freak Show" did not enter Gaon Digital Chart, but peaked at number 110 on the Gaon Download Chart.)	—	—	—	—	—N/a	From Now On, Showtime! OST Part 1
"—" denotes items that did not chart or were not released in that region.

=== Other charted songs ===
Title	Year	Peak chart positions	Album
Title	Year	KOR Gaon	Album
"Weather"	2021	— (Note: "Weather" did not enter Gaon Digital Chart, but debuted and peaked at number 70 on Gaon Download Chart.)	Windy
"Quit"	2021	— (Note: "Quit" did not enter Gaon Digital Chart, but debuted and peaked at number 77 on Gaon Download Chart.)	Windy
"Psycho"	2021	— (Note: "Psycho" did not enter Gaon Digital Chart, but debuted and peaked at number 68 on Gaon Download Chart.)	Windy
"Is this bad b****** number?" (featuring Bibi, Lee Young-ji)	2021	— (Note: "Is this bad b****** number?" did not enter Gaon Digital Chart, but debuted and peaked at number 45 on Gaon Download Chart.)	Windy
"—" denotes a recording that did not chart or was not released in that territory.

=== Other songs ===
Title	Year	Album	Ref.
"The Loveless" (애정결핍)	2019	Non-album single	

== Videography ==
=== Music videos ===
Title	Year	Director(s)	Ref.
"Jelly"	2017	Unknown	
"Idle Song" (아이들 쏭)	2018	Unknown	
"Beam Beam"	2021	Oui Kim	
"I'm Okay"	2023	Unknown	
"I'm Gonna Toesa" (퇴사할게여) (featuring Kian84)	2026	Unknown	
Collaborations
"Wow Thing" (with Seulgi, SinB and Kim Chung-ha)	2018	Doori Kwak (GDW)	
"Nobody" (with Winter (Aespa), Liz (Ive))	2023	Zanybros	
As featured artist
"I Wanna Be" (Key feat. Soyeon)	2019	Paranoid Paradigm (VM Project Architecture)	
"Dessert" (Hyoyeon feat. Soyeon and Loopy)	2020	Unknown	
"Don't Die" (Odetari feat. Soyeon)	2026	Miggy	

== Filmography ==
=== Television shows ===
Year	Title	Role	Notes	Ref.
2016	Produce 101	Contestant	Finished 20th Eliminated on episode 11 (Final)	
2016	Unpretty Rapstar 3	Contestant	Finished 3rd	
2021	My Teenage Girl	Homeroom teacher		
2023	Fantasy Boys	Producer		

=== Web shows ===
Year	Title	Role	Notes	Ref.
2021	Face ID	Cast member	Episodes 21–23	
2024	Chef Sso's Country Kitchen Dream	Host		
2025–present	Star! Cooking Show	Host		

=== Radio shows ===
Year	Title	Role	Notes	Ref.
2021	#OutNow Jeon So-yeon	Official DJ	July 5, 2021–present, every Monday	

== Awards and nominations ==
Name of the award ceremony, year presented, category, nominee of the award, and the result of the nomination
Award ceremony	Year	Category	Nominee / Work	Result	Ref.
APAN Music Awards	2020	Best All-rounder	Jeon So-yeon	Nominated	
Asian Pop Music Awards (Note: Hosted by the Hong Kong Asia Pacific International Group and Sunway Records, the Asian Pop Music Awards bases its winners on the "Asian Pop Music Chart" which opened in September 2019.)	2021	Best Lyricist (Overseas)	"Hwaa"	Nominated	
Asian Pop Music Awards	2023	Best Producer (Overseas)	"Queencard"	Won	
Brand of the Year Awards	2022	Best Female Multi-Entertainer	Jeon So-yeon	Won	
Game Audio Network Guild Awards	2020	Best Original Song	"Giants" (as True Damage)	Won	
Hallyu Hip-hop Culture Awards	2017	Popularity Award	Jeon So-yeon	Won	
Korea First Brand Awards (Note: Hosted by the Korea Consumer Brand Committee and the Korea Consumer Forum, the Korea First Brand Awards bases its winners on a nationwide South Korean survey.)	2022	Female Solo (Rising Star) Award	Jeon So-yeon	Nominated	
MBC Entertainment Awards	2021	Rookie Award	My Teenage Girl	Nominated	
MBC Entertainment Awards	2021	Special Award (Note: with Kwon Yu-ri, Ock Joo-hyun, and Aiki)	My Teenage Girl	Won	
Melon Music Awards	2022	Best Songwriter	Jeon So-yeon	Won	
Melon Music Awards	2024	Best Songwriter	Jeon So-yeon	Won	
