= Lexie Liu discography =

Recordings by Chinese singer and rapper

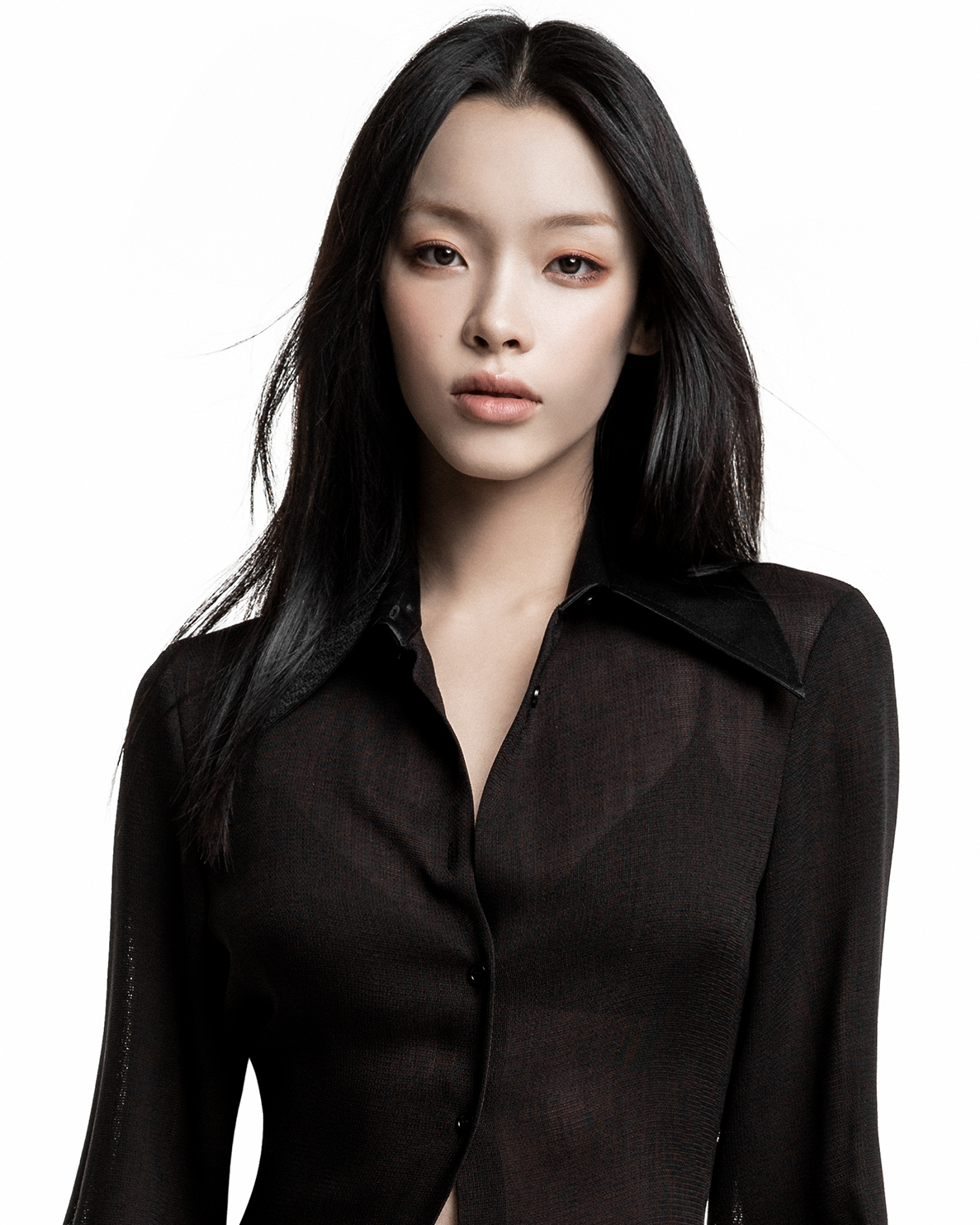
- Studio albums: 3
- EPs: 2
- Live albums: 1
- Singles: 9
- Promotional singles: 7
- Soundtracks: 2

This is the discography of Chinese recording artist Lexie Liu. She has released three studio albums, including 2029 (2018), Meta Ego (无限意识) (2019), and The Happy Star (幸福星) (2022).

== Albums ==
=== Studio albums ===
Title	Details
2029	Released: October 16, 2018; Label: Nixie Music; Formats: CD, digital download, streaming
Meta Ego (无限意识)	Released: December 27, 2019; Label: Nixie Music; Formats: CD, digital download, streaming
The Happy Star (幸福星)	Released: December 7, 2022; Label: Nixie Music; Formats: CD, digital download, streaming

=== Live albums ===
Title	Details
The Next Big Thing: Lexie Liu (Live) (刘柏辛Lexie·专场)	Released: July 2019; Label: Beijing Zhongzi Jiesheng Culture; Formats: Digital download, streaming

== Extended plays ==
Title	Details
2030	Released: February 1, 2019; Label: Nixie Music; Formats: CD, digital download, streaming
Gone Gold (上线了)	Released: January 28, 2021; Label: Nixie Music; Formats: CD, digital download, streaming
Teenage Ramble	Released: October 16, 2025; Label: Nixie Music; Formats: CD, digital download, streaming

== Singles ==
=== As lead artist ===
Title	Year	Album
"Sleep Away"	2018	2029
"Ok, Ok, Ok" (好吗, 好啦, 好吧)	2019	Non-album single
"Manta"	2019	Meta Ego
"ALGTR" (有嗎炒麵)	2021	Gone Gold
"Shadow"	2021	Gone Gold
"L" (了)	2021	Gone Gold
"Fortuna" (命运)	2022	The Happy Star
"Magician" (爱无限)	2022	The Happy Star
"Delulu"	2023	Non-album single
"Pop Girl"	2025	Teenage Ramble
"FFFFF"	2025	Teenage Ramble
"Like U"	2025	Teenage Ramble
"X"	2025	Teenage Ramble

=== As featured artist ===
Title	Year	Album
"Fire Line" (防火线) (Jony J featuring Lexie Liu)	2015	Non-album singles
"Roles" (角色) (Li Yifeng featuring Lexie Liu)	2018	Non-album singles
"City Lights" (城市灯火) (Al Rocco featuring Lexie Liu)	2018	Non-album singles
"RaRa" (Curtis Cold featuring Lexie Liu)	2018	Non-album singles
"Two Ordinary Youths" (两个普普通通小青年) (Li Ronghao featuring Lexie Liu)	2020	Sparrow
"WYA Remix" (Jay Park, Ningning from Aespa featuring pH-1, Lexie Liu, ØZI & Masiwei)	2023	Non-album single
"On Clap" (Yuqi from I-dle featuring Lexie Liu)	2024	Yuq1
"Break it" (Yves featuring Lexie Liu)	2026	Nail

=== Promotional singles ===
Title	Year	Peak chart positions			Album
Title	Year	SGP	US World	WW	Album
"We Don't Stop" (渴不停)	2020	—	—	—	Thirst Don’t Stop Th Sprite Theme Song
"Peacock Dance" (瞳·雀)	2020	—	—	—	QQ Dance Anniversary Song
"Dare to Be" (敢为)	2020	—	—	—	New Nisan Brand Refresh Theme Song
"More" (as Seraphine, with (G)I-dle, Madison Beer and Jaira Burns)	2020	10	1	125	All Out
"Kappa Girl" (佳人)	2020	—	—	—	Kappa Girl Theme Song
"818"	2021	—	—	—	Zhejiang Television 818 Gala Theme Song
"Top Speed Player" (全速玩家)	2021	—	—	—	realme GT Neo Promotion Song
"COME DANCE (MIU MIU ENCOUNTERS)"	2025	—	—	—	Miu Miu Chinese New Year

== Soundtrack appearances ==
Title	Year	Album
“The Soaring Egret" (白鹭思一骋)	2017	The Forbidden City Documentary
"Deep Down"	2021	VS Yan Lun short animation series episode
