= More (K/DA song) =

2020 single by K/DA

Single by Madison Beer, (G)I-dle, Lexie Liu, Jaira Burns, Seraphine as K/DA

from the EP All Out
- Language: English; Korean; Chinese
- Released: October 28, 2020
- Genre: K-pop
- Length: 3:37
- Label: Riot Games; Stone
- Songwriters: Riot Music Team; Rebecca Johnson; Sebastien Najand
- Producers: Riot Music Team; K/DA; Seraphine

K/DA singles chronology
"The Baddest" (2020)	"More" (2020)	"Firestarter" (2026)

Madison Beer singles chronology
"Baby" (2020)	"More" (2020)	"Boyshit" (2020)

(G)I-dle singles chronology
"The Baddest" (2020)	"More" (2020)	"Hwaa" (2021)

Lexie Liu singles chronology
"Meta Ego" (2019)	"More" (2020)	"ALGTR" (2021)

Jaira Burns singles chronology
"Hard Liquor" (2019)	"More" (2020)	"Tesla X" (2021)

Music video
- "More" on YouTube

"More" is a song by virtual girl group K/DA. The song was released on October 28, 2020, as the second single from the group's extended play All Out. The song features the original four-member lineup from K/DA's debut single "Pop/Stars", which includes Soyeon and Miyeon of (G)I-dle, Madison Beer, and Jaira Burns, as well as a fifth member, Lexie Liu, who voices Seraphine. Commercially, the song debuted on the Billboard Global 200 and Billboard Global Excl. U.S., making "More" the first virtual band song to simultaneously debut on the chart.

== Release and promotion ==
The group began to tease the song on their social media platforms before officially announcing its release to be October 28, 2020. Upon the song's release, Riot released several official K/DA merchandise, in which the collection features a wide range of apparel items from collectables with holographic and reflective materials, to the branding of K/DA's EP, All Out. The group also launched the hashtags, "#YouWantMore" and "#MoreChallenge", on various social media platforms such as TikTok and Twitter. On October 29, players were able to acquire and purchase limited-time themed icons, skins and other in-game cosmetics in League of Legends, League of Legends: Wild Rift and Legends of Runeterra. There are two available icons; the K/DA logo signed by all members of the group, and an image of the featured artist, Seraphine. The skin line which is available in League of Legends and Wild Rift is called "K/DA All Out" and is available for Ahri, Akali, Kai'Sa, Evelynn, and Seraphine.

Erika Thomas of DBLTAP described "More" a "re-upped single that definitely does not disappoint." Judah Charles Lotter of Meaww described the song "a stomp-hard pop track electrified by synth and antheming out vocals in the chorus."

Cover versions by several artists including Ukrainian artist Maruv and Polish singer and songwriter Ewelina Lisowska also have been released.

On October 29, K/DA and Seraphine appeared on the official cover of fashion magazine Dazed's China November issue in Louis Vuitton.

== Composition ==
"More" is composed of the K/DA's original singers Evelynn, Ahri, and Kai'Sa, as well as Akali, who returns to the group after debuting in True Damage in 2019. Seraphine, the 152nd champion and new champion of League of Legends, participates as a featured artist, singing the bridge with a mix of Chinese and English lyrics.

== Commercial performance ==
After one day of tracking, the song charted on South Korea's major domestic music sites such as Melon, Genie, Bugs, and Flo. The song debuted at number 2 on the US World Digital Song Sales with only one and half day of tracking. The track also charted at number 16 on the China QQ Music and peaked at number 1 on the QQ Game Music Chart.

== Live performance ==
In September, it was reported that K/DA would perform at the opening ceremony of the 2020 League of Legends World Championship Finals. It is co-produced by Possible Productions, who produced other works such as the MTV Video Music Awards and the Super Bowl Halftime shows. The stage would incorporate Unreal Engine 5, modified by Possible Productions, and Lux Machina and would have over 40 VR and AR techs and artists. David Higdon, Head of Global Esports Communications at Riot Games said, "It's the most advanced mixed reality rendering system in the world, which will render in real-time at 32K resolution and 60 FPS. It’s pretty mind-blowing. Worlds 2020 is going to be unlike anything you've seen before."

On October 31, K/DA performed "More" at Pudong Football Stadium, Shanghai, China as the opening ceremony of the 10th anniversary of League of Legends World Championship and the finals between Damwon Gaming and Suning. Due to travel restrictions related to the COVID-19 pandemic, only Lexie Liu was able to perform live on stage with the virtual K/DA. The group performed for the crowd of 6,000 fans in attendance. "More" was choreographed by The Kinjaz, who is best known for being the runners-up eight season of MTV's America's Best Dance Crew.

== Music video ==
=== Development ===
The music video was created by Axis Studio.

Ducati revealed a partnership with League of Legends, designing a digital bike of Ducati Panigale V4 for Akali in the music video.

=== Synopsis ===
The music video features Ahri, Akali, Evelynn and Kai'Sa drive a high-octane motorcycle, hover in zero gravity, and perform pop choreography against a changing colorful backdrop. The digital quartet sings the chorus while dancing in the gilded throne room before Seraphine is revealed and performs the track's bridge. Seraphine's diary was seen opened in her bedroom floor. On the page, it shows her starting point in July, when she was an independent singer and had not been revealed as a new hero of LoL. Her room was filled with various posters and merchandise such as posters that showed her close relationship with Soyeon and Miyeon as the voice actor of Akali and Ahri. There is a yellow poster of the cover image of (G)I-dle's song "Dumdi Dumdi", and the black poster above is the logo of Neverland, (G)I-dle's official fandom name. The ending scene of "More", K/DA and Seraphine performed on the skyscraper rooftop in the middle of the night. Some digital billboards display other games from Riot Games, such as the inverted animation of the Valorant logo on the left and the revised logo of LoL Esports on the right.

=== Reception ===
The official music video premiered on YouTube on October 28, 2020. The music video recorded 5 million views in 10 hours and garnered over 10 million views in its first 24 hours. Less than a day after it went live, the video has been played more than 140,000 times on QQ Music, and ranked 7th on the Weekly MV list with comments reached more than 3,000 in an instant. The music video debuted and charted at number 5 on QQ Music Music Video and peaked number 3 on the chart issue dated November 9–15, 2020.

== International versions ==
"More" European versions
Language	Performer	Title	Ref.
French	Aöme (Aome)	"More"	
Polish	Ewelina Lisowska	"More"	
Russian	Maruv	"More"	
Spanish	Eva B	"More"	
Swedish	Theoz (Theo Haraldsson)	"More"	

== Track listing ==
- Download and streaming
1. "More" – 3:37

== Credits and personnel ==
Credits are adapted from Melon and Tidal.

- Vocals – Soyeon and Miyeon of (G)I-dle, Madison Beer, Lexie Liu, Jaira Burns and Seraphine
- Riot Games Music Team – production, composer, songwriting, vocal production, mix engineer, mastering engineer
- Sebastien Najand – composer
- Rebecca Johnson – songwriting, additional vocals
- Lexie Liu - Chinese translation
- Lydia Paek – Korean translation
- Minji Kim – Korean translation

== Charts ==
Chart (2020)	Peak position
Canada Hot Digital Song Sales (Billboard)	48
China (QQ Music Weekly Chart)	16
Czech Republic Singles Digital (ČNS IFPI)	51
Global 200 (Billboard)	125
Greece (IFPI)	65
Hungary (Single Top 40)	16
Hungary (Stream Top 40)	15
Malaysia (RIM)	18
New Zealand Hot Singles (RMNZ)	9
Singapore (RIAS)	10
Slovakia Singles Digital (ČNS IFPI)	64
South Korea (Gaon Download)	96
UK Independent (Official Charts)	23
US World Digital Song Sales (Billboard)	1

== Certifications ==
Region	Certification	Certified units/sales
United States (RIAA)	Gold	500,000^{‡}
^{‡} Sales+streaming figures based on certification alone.

== Release history ==
Region	Release date	Format	Distributor	Ref.
Various	October 28, 2020	Digital download; streaming	Riot Games	
South Korea	October 29, 2020	Digital download; streaming	Riot Games; Stone	
