= Bekuh Boom =

American singer and songwriter

Bekuh BOOM
- Also known as: Bekuh Boom
- Born: Rebecca Rose Johnson; June 21, 1994 (age 32); Orange County, California, U.S.
- Genres: Pop; R&B; dance; K-pop; hip hop
- Occupations: Singer; songwriter
- Years active: 2013–present
- Website: bekuhboom.com

Rebecca Rose Johnson, professionally known as Bekuh Boom (stylized as Bekuh BOOM) is an American singer and songwriter. Johnson signed her first publishing deal to Warner Chappell Music at the age of 18. She featured on two co-written singles: "I Won't Let You Down" by Danish singer Christopher, which charted at #1 on Tracklisten, the official Danish music charts, and "Money" by Norwegian electronic duo Broiler, which peaked at #3 on Norwegian music charts. As of 2016 she has written over 10 songs reaching the #1 position on various music charts. Boom wrote and composed for various acts including R. Kelly, Jordin Sparks, Christopher, Taeyang, Winner, iKon, Blackpink, Jeon Somi and Lisa.

== Early life and career ==
=== Early life ===
Bekuh Boom was born Rebecca Rose Johnson on June 21, 1994, in Orange County, California. She stated that she had an interest in music since elementary school. At the age of 11, she began learning how to write and compose her own melodies for her songs. She revealed that she took dance and choreography classes in high school to become a dance instructor and choreographer.

=== 2011–2017: American Idol and Chappell Music contract ===
In 2011, at the age of 16, Boom participated in the tenth season of American Idol, where she made top 60 after losing in the group round. At the age of 18 she signed her first contract with Warner Chappell Music, going on to release her first two collaborations titled "Money" and "I Won't Let You Down".

Later, she landed deals primarily as a composer and producer for K-pop artists, where two of the songs that she worked on were picked and released through YG Entertainment, namely "Eyes, Nose, Lips" by Taeyang and "I'm Different" by Hi Suhyun. Prior to becoming a K-pop composer and producer, Boom had composed songs for singers such as R. Kelly, Jordin Sparks and Jessica Mauboy. In 2012 she was connected with Blackpink via YG Entertainment, where she studied Korean with them. In 2016, Boom became the songwriter and producer for two of Blackpink's debut singles, "Whistle" and "Boombayah", which occupied the #1 chart on World Digital Song Sales and Circle Digital Chart respectively. She followed up writing 9 more songs for BLACKPINK, as well as writing the hit smash "Money" for LISA. The next year she worked on Winner's song "Island", which topped the charts.

=== 2018–present: working with Blackpink and solo activities ===
In 2020 she became the lyricist and composer for the virtual group K/DA, where she provided the voice of Ahri. Later that year she released a solo single called "There's No Place Like Home". In March 2021, she released the single "Designer Love", with an accompanying music video being released for the song on Johnson's YouTube channel. In August 2022, she released the single "Anime Eyes".

== Songwriting credits ==
Year	Song title	Artist	Album
2013	"Cookie"	R. Kelly	Black Panties
2013	"Skipping a Beat"	Jordin Sparks	Non-album single
2013	"Pop a Bottle (Fill Me Up)"	Jessica Mauboy	Beautiful
2014	"Eyes, Nose, Lips"	Taeyang	Rise
2014	"I'm Different"	Hi Suhyun featuring Bobby	Non-album single
2015	"Shake The Ground"	Hedegaard featuring Brandon Beal and Bekuh Boom	Non-album song
2016	"Golden"	Brandon Beal featuring Lukas Graham	Truth
2016	"Money"	Broiler featuring Bekuh Boom	Non-album single
2016	"Catch Me"	Cosmic Girls	Would You Like?
2016	"Blues" (희망고문)	Lee Hi	Seoulite
2016	"I Won't Let You Down"	Christopher featuring Bekuh Boom	Closer
2016	"Whistle" (휘파람)	Blackpink	Square One
2016	"Boombayah" (붐바야)	Blackpink	Square One
2017	"Island"	Winner	Our Twenty Four
2018	"Best Friend"	iKon	Return
2018	"Ddu-Du Ddu-Du" (뚜두뚜두)	Blackpink	Square Up
2018	"Goodbye Road"	iKon	New Kids: The Final
2019	"Kill This Love"	Blackpink	Kill This Love
2019	"Don't Know What to Do"	Blackpink	Kill This Love
2019	"Good Idea"	Broiler featuring Bekuh Boom	Non-album single
2019	"Birthday"	Jeon Somi	XOXO
2020	"The Baddest"	(G)I-dle, Bea Miller, and Wolftyla as K/DA	All Out
2020	"More"	Madison Beer, (G)I-dle, Lexie Liu, Jaira Burns and Seraphine as K/DA	All Out
2020	"Villain"	Madison Beer and Kim Petras as K/DA Evelynn	All Out
2020	"Drum Go Dum"	Aluna, Wolftyla, and Bekuh Boom as K/DA Kaisa	All Out
2020	"I'll Show You"	Twice (Jihyo, Nayeon, Sana, and Chaeyoung), Bekuh Boom, and Annika Wells as K/DA Ahri	All Out
2020	"Ice Cream"	Blackpink and Selena Gomez	The Album
2020	"Pretty Savage"	Blackpink	The Album
2020	"Crazy Over You"	Blackpink	The Album
2020	"You Never Know"	Blackpink	The Album
2021	"Lalisa"	Lisa	Lalisa
2021	"Money"	Lisa	Lalisa
2022	"Church"	Jennifer Lopez (feat. Maluma)	Marry Me
2022	"Wonderland"	AleXa	American Song Contest: Episode 1
2022	"Ready for Love"	Blackpink	Born Pink
2022	"Typa Girl"	Blackpink	Born Pink
2022	"MAGICIAN"	Lexie Liu	The Happy Star
2022	"MIRA"	Lexie Liu	The Happy Star
2022	"Shanti"	Lexie Liu	The Happy Star
2023	"Shoong!" (슝!)	Taeyang featuring Lisa	Down to Earth
2023	"The Way To" (Vocal Unit; 어른)	Treasure	Reboot
2023	"Fast Forward"	Jeon Somi	Game Plan
2023	"You & Me (Coachella ver.)"	Jennie	Non-album single
2024	IYKYK (If You Know You Know)	Illit	
2025	Icy Bishh	Boombby	Non-album single
2025	Test Drive	Boombby	Non-album single
2025	Drop Top	MEOVV	
2025	There They Go	KiiiKiii	
2025	Do What I Want	Monsta X	The X
