= Vana (singer) =

New Zealand alt-metal musician

- Born: Yvonne Winckel; 27 December 2000 (age 25); Anaheim, California
- Origin: Auckland, New Zealand
- Genres: Heavy metal; pop rock; alternative rock
- Occupations: Singer; songwriter
- Years active: 2022–present
- Labels: Rebellion; Sumerian
- Website: Vana Music Official

Yvonne Winckel (born 27 December 2000), known professionally as Vana or Vana NZ (/ˈvɑːnə/ Vah-nə), is an American-born New Zealand singer, songwriter, and heavy metal musician. She is known for her single "Beg!", released in 2024. Her exposure to religion throughout her childhood shaped the darker themes of her music. Vana has grown her fan base through live streaming games such as Baldur's Gate 3 on Twitch.

== Early life ==
Yvonne Winckel was born in Anaheim, California, and throughout her early childhood she lived with her mother and younger siblings. This time period was troubling for her as her family was nearly homeless. When she was 10 her family was able to move to Auckland, New Zealand where her father, a jazz musician, lived. She was raised by a Catholic household and went to Catholic School. Vana's religious upbringing is heavily reflected in her music. Her bedroom was full of cut outs of Taylor Swift from magazines. Vana never took any lessons in music and taught herself how to play guitar and bass, as well teaching herself music production. The only musical instrument Winckel was officially trained in was the clarinet, though she never acknowledged it as her "weapon of choice". She first started recording her own music when she was 15 years old. Her stage name is a shortened form of "Yvonna", which was her father's nickname for her. She spent her childhood going to concerts of various bands such as Linkin Park, Green Day, and Paramore.

== Career ==
=== 2022–2024: Die For Me and Trial and Terror EPs ===
In 2022 Vana released a single in collaboration with SXMPRA called "Black Sheep" followed by "You're Not the Only One." in collaboration with Glitchedout. In early 2023, Vana released her debut single, "Foggy Windows" and another standalone single "Crawling."

Later in 2023, Vana released her debut EP titled Die for Me!, which includes the tracks 'Die for Me!", "Pretty Boy", "Disgusting", "Nosebleed", and "Spit." The songs on the EP explore themes of sapphic vampire lovers and a woman who stalks a man who is in a psychiatric ward, while "Pretty Boy" is addressed to a fusion of the boys she had a crush on at the time who were "on the feminine side" with the song itself being what would she say to that person if she "was all alone in the room with them and had all the confidence in the world". The song was co-produced with Glitchedout, who also co-produced "You're Not the Only One", and Chequered Pattern$. The EP uses soft vocals on top of electronic grunge sounds.

In early 2024 Vana released the single "Clandestine." This single marked a milestone for Vana as a metalcore artist. Later in 2024 Vana released the single "Beg!" 2024 Vana released a second EP titled Trial and Terror. Tracks include, "Ragdoll", "Beg!", "Harlequin", "Playboi" featuring Sophie Powers, "Noxious" and "Serpentine." It continues Vana's theme of genre blurring music, combining elements from pop, alternative, metal, and even hip-hop.

=== 2025–present: Sumerian record deal and upcoming debut album ===
In 2025, Vana signed a new record deal to Sumerian Records. After finishing supporting Set It Off and Fame On Fire on their tour, Vana released the first single from the new record label, "Pray". The music video for "Pray" was directed by Tanner James Gordon. Like many of Vana's songs, it was heavily influenced by Vana's religious upbringing. The song features the use of R&B inspired beat and rhythm. On March 18, 2026, Vana supported Linkin Park on their tour. In December 2025, Vana announced her first headline tour, the Lady In Red Tour, which started in April 2026 with guests, Cloudyfield, RedHook and Deadlands. Before the tour started Cloudyfield was replaced by Chandler Leighton as one of the guest performers. April saw the release of Vana's latest single "In Your Name".

Vana is set to release her debut album in the fall of 2026. The album is said to explore Vana's interests in the topics of gothic literature, Lovecraftian horror and anime from the view of an outsider.

== Artistry and influences ==
The themes that Vana expresses in her music delve heavily into LGBTQ inclusivity, female empowerment, and mental health awareness topics. Many of Vana's songs reflect her religious upbringing during her childhood. Vana's music combines the art of a dark pop song with metal music and often blurs the line between various musical genres. Vana cites Pierce the Veil, Sleeping with Sirens and Bring Me the Horizon as influences for her style of music.

== Personal life ==
Outside of her musical career, Vana is a streamer on the popular streaming platform Twitch, which is how she has found a way to connect to and grow her fanbase. Some of her activities on Twitch include the role playing game D&D and Baldur's Gate 3 or watching horror movies.

== Discography ==
Vana Discography
Title	Type	Year
"You're Not the Only One" (featuring Glitchedout)	Single	2022
"Foggy Windows"	Single	2023
"Crawling"	Single	2023
"Prettyboy!"	Single	2023
"Spit!"	Single	2023
Die for Me!	EP	2023
"Ragdoll"	Single	2024
"Clandestine"	Single	2024
"Beg!"	Single	2024
"Playboi" (featuring Sophie Powers)	Single	2024
"Serpentine"	Single	2024
Trial & Terror	EP	2024
"Pleaser"	Single	2025
"Bite Back"	Single	2025
"Pray"	Single	2025
"In Your Name"	Single	2026
"Bleeding Heart"	Single	2026

=== Music videos ===
Year	Title	Director(s)
2023	"You're Not the Only One"	Unknown
2023	"Crawling"	Lewis Condie
2023	"Disgusting!"	Lewis Condie
2024	"Clandestine"	Vana
2024	"Beg!"	Coco Joelle & Areon Mobasher
2024	"Serpentine"	Coco Joelle
2025	"Pray"	Tanner James Gordon
2026	"In Your Name"	Tanner James Gordon
2026	"Bleeding Heart"	Coco Joelle & Areon Mobasher

=== As featured artist ===
Name	Artist	Year
Black Sheep	SXMPRA	2022
The Devil Wears Prada	PLVTINUM, Shaker	2023
Hexxx	RedHook	2024
Your Majesty	Dal Av & Jackson Rose	2024
Worship	Magnolia Park & PLVTINUM	2025
