= All Out (EP) =

EP by K/DA
- Released: 6 November 2020
- Genres: K-pop; trap
- Length: 16:19
- Languages: English; Korean; Mandarin
- Labels: Riot Games; Stone
- Producers: K/DA; Seraphine (exec.); Riot Music Team; Sebastien Najand; Yasuo

K/DA chronology
| All Out (2020) | Firestarter (2026) |

Singles from All Out
- 1. "The Baddest" Released: August 27, 2020; 2. "More" Released: October 28, 2020

All Out (stylized in all caps) is the debut extended play by virtual girl group K/DA, released on November 6, 2020, through Riot Games and Stone Music Entertainment. It contains five songs which feature vocals from Soyeon and Miyeon of (G)I-dle, Madison Beer, and Jaira Burns, the four of whom form the original line-up, plus contributions by Bea Miller, Wolftyla, Lexie Liu, Kim Petras, Aluna, Bekuh Boom, Annika Wells, and Twice members Jihyo, Sana, Nayeon, and Chaeyoung. Each song was produced by one of the fictional members of the group, with the exception of "More".

All Out was preceded by the pre-release single "The Baddest" on August 27, 2020, and lead single "More" on October 28, 2020. Both singles reached number one on the Billboard World Digital Song Sales.

== Background ==
After releasing "The Baddest" on August 27, 2020, the group released several teaser images starting with Akali, Evelynn, Kai'sa and Ahri with the phrase "#Wherewevebeen #KDA #CallingBlades" on their social media accounts. On September 5, K/DA confirmed that they are working on a collaboration with Seraphine, a fictional virtual influencer after fans have speculated since she has been posting on Twitter, Instagram, and SoundCloud and art style seemed in line with other characters from the game. On her in-character Instagram account, Seraphine confirmed she would serve as one of the producers for the EP. Simultaneously, Riot released the first episode of their new web comic series titled K/DA: Harmonies showing behind-the-scenes of the group's recording process, members encounter, experiences and adventures. On September 28, K/DA unveiled its official fandom lightstick in a shaped of a stage microphone, featuring a black criss-cross pattern on its handle, and their first fan recruitment for Blades, the group's official fandom name.

== Announcement and release ==
"We prepared this EP album in respond to the support from fans around the world, who showed explosive interest and support after K/DA debuted in 2018."

— Toa Dunn, the general manager of Riot Games' Music Team

On October 2, it was announced K/DA's debut extended play title All Out, album's official cover art and multiple pieces of promotional artwork have been released alongside the announcement. It was reported that the lead single will be presented during the 2020 League of Legends World Championship alongside Seraphine, who was rumored to be one of the next champions for League of Legends. On October 9, the group revealed the album track listing. On October 12, Riot Games released new skin for K/DA's members Akali, Evelynn, Ahri, and Kai’Sa including Seraphine. The skin for Seraphine is release as it evolves to become a pop star, from 'Seraphine Indie' 'Seraphine Rising Star' to 'Seraphine Superstar'. Informations about Seraphine as the champion was not clarified, but, it was confirmed later the next day by Riot Games by announcing Seraphine as the new mage winner with music-themed skills. On October 16, Riot Games revealed the full line-up artist which feature five different tracks, with over ten different artists.

== Promotion ==
Two days after the release of "More", Riot held various events and contents prepared to commemorate the release of K/DA's first EP All Out, through League of Legends, Legends of Runeterra (LoR), Teamfight Tactics (TFT), and League of Legends: Wild Rift. In LoR, a 'K/DA All Out Event Pass' is issued. With this pass, the players get a set of K/DA's limited epic order cards, and purchase a premium event pass to get more rewards and new game mode 'K/DA Star Power'. It is a method in which the player directly selects a card from the deck with each member as the main character. In addition, 'K/DA board', special performance songs are included on the board. In TFT, Feather Knight, Fluffy Tail, Whining, Horn, and Flash will appear in a new form that based on K/DA's concept. It can be purchased as 'K/DA Little Legend Knows' or as an individual appearance from November 12. In Wild Rift, players can earn various rewards by playing the game as a K/DA member champion and performing missions and also purchase the K/DA All Out skin from LoL at Wild Rift. The same day, Logitech's brand Logitech G announced they partnered with Riot Games to launch a set of League of Legends gear with a new K/DA-inspired gaming products. Riot Games also conducts outdoor advertisements by accessing the QR code to 'K/DA Comeback Support Event' displayed on the billboard near Samseong station, Express Terminal and entrance to the Starfield COEX Mall, which are known as spots where idol advertisements are held.

== Track listing ==
All tracks are written by Rebecca Johnson and Sebastien Najand.

| No. | Title | Performers | Length |
|---|---|---|---|
| 1. | "The Baddest" | i-dle; Wolftyla; Bea Miller | 2:43 |
| 2. | "More" | Madison Beer; i-dle; Lexie Liu; Jaira Burns; Seraphine | 3:37 |
| 3. | "Villain" | Madison Beer; Kim Petras | 3:19 |
| 4. | "Drum Go Dum" | Bekuh Boom; Wolftyla; Aluna | 3:21 |
| 5. | "I'll Show You" | Bekuh Boom; Twice; Annika Wells | 3:19 |
| Total length: | | | 16:19 |

Notes

- All track titles are stylized in all caps.

== Personnel ==
- Riot Music Team – production (all tracks)
- Sebastien Najand – production (tracks 1, 3-5)
- Yasuo – production (track 1)
- Oscar Free – additional vocal production (tracks 1, 3-5)
- Aaron Aguilar – additional vocal production (track 3)
- Akali – executive production (tracks 1, 2)
- Seraphine – executive production (track 2)
- Evelynn – executive production (tracks 2, 3)
- Kai'Sa – executive production (tracks 2, 4)
- Ahri – executive production (tracks 2, 5)

== Accolades ==
Year-end lists
| Critic/Publication | List | Rank | Album/Song | Ref. |
|---|---|---|---|---|
| Billboard | The 30 Best Pop Songs of 2020: Staff Picks | —N/a | "Villain" | |
| Billboard | The 25 Best Pop Albums of 2020: Staff Picks | —N/a | All Out | |

== Charts ==
Chart performance for All Out
| Chart (2020) | Peak position |
|---|---|
| Canadian Albums (Billboard) | 65 |
| French Albums (SNEP) | 186 |
| New Zealand Albums (RMNZ) | 36 |
| Spanish Albums (Promusicae) | 54 |
| US Billboard 200 | 176 |
| US Heatseekers Albums (Billboard) | 1 |
| US Independent Albums (Billboard) | 33 |
| US Rolling Stone Top 200 | 148 |
| US World Albums (Billboard) | 5 |
