= K/DA =

Virtual K-pop girl group

- Promotional image by Riot Games; From left to right: Kai'Sa, Ahri, Akali and Evelynn

Background information
- Origin: League of Legends by Riot Games
- Genres: K-pop; EDM
- Years active: 2018–2020; 2026–present
- Labels: Riot Games; Stone (Korea)
- Members: Ahri (Miyeon); Akali (Soyeon); Evelynn (Sophie Powers); Kai'Sa (Mimi Webb)
- Past members: Madison Beer (as Evelynn); Jaira Burns (as Kai'Sa)
- Website: universe.leagueoflegends.com/en_US/kda

K/DA (/keɪ diː ˈeɪ/ kay dee ay) is a virtual K-pop girl group consisting of four themed versions of League of Legends characters Ahri, Akali, Evelynn, and Kai'Sa. The original lineup of vocalists for them consists of I-dle members Miyeon and Soyeon as Ahri and Akali, respectively, alongside Madison Beer as Evelynn and Jaira Burns as Kai'Sa. Other artists have also voiced the characters. In 2026, Sophie Powers and Mimi Webb replaced Beer and Burns.

K/DA was developed by Riot Games, the company behind League of Legends, and was unveiled at the 2018 League of Legends World Championship with an augmented reality live performance of their debut single, "Pop/Stars". A music video of the song uploaded to YouTube subsequently went viral, surpassing 100 million views in one month, reaching 643 million views as of September 2025, and topping Billboard's World Digital Song Sales chart. In 2020, K/DA released their debut extended play All Out, which includes the pre-release single "The Baddest" and the lead single "More". In 2022, "Pop/Stars" was certified platinum by the Recording Industry Association of America (RIAA), making K/DA and I-dle the first K-pop girl groups in history to achieve this milestone. A second extended play, Firestarter, was released in 2026, led by the title track as lead single.

The conception of K/DA was based on Riot's expressed desire to create more musical content, with the characters chosen based on K-pop archetypes. The group was created to promote the League World Championship and to sell in-game K/DA skins of the characters in League of Legends. K/DA has subsequently achieved popularity both within and beyond the League of Legends fandom and received critical acclaim, particularly for their performance during the World Championship and the impact of gaming on the music scene.

== Appearances ==
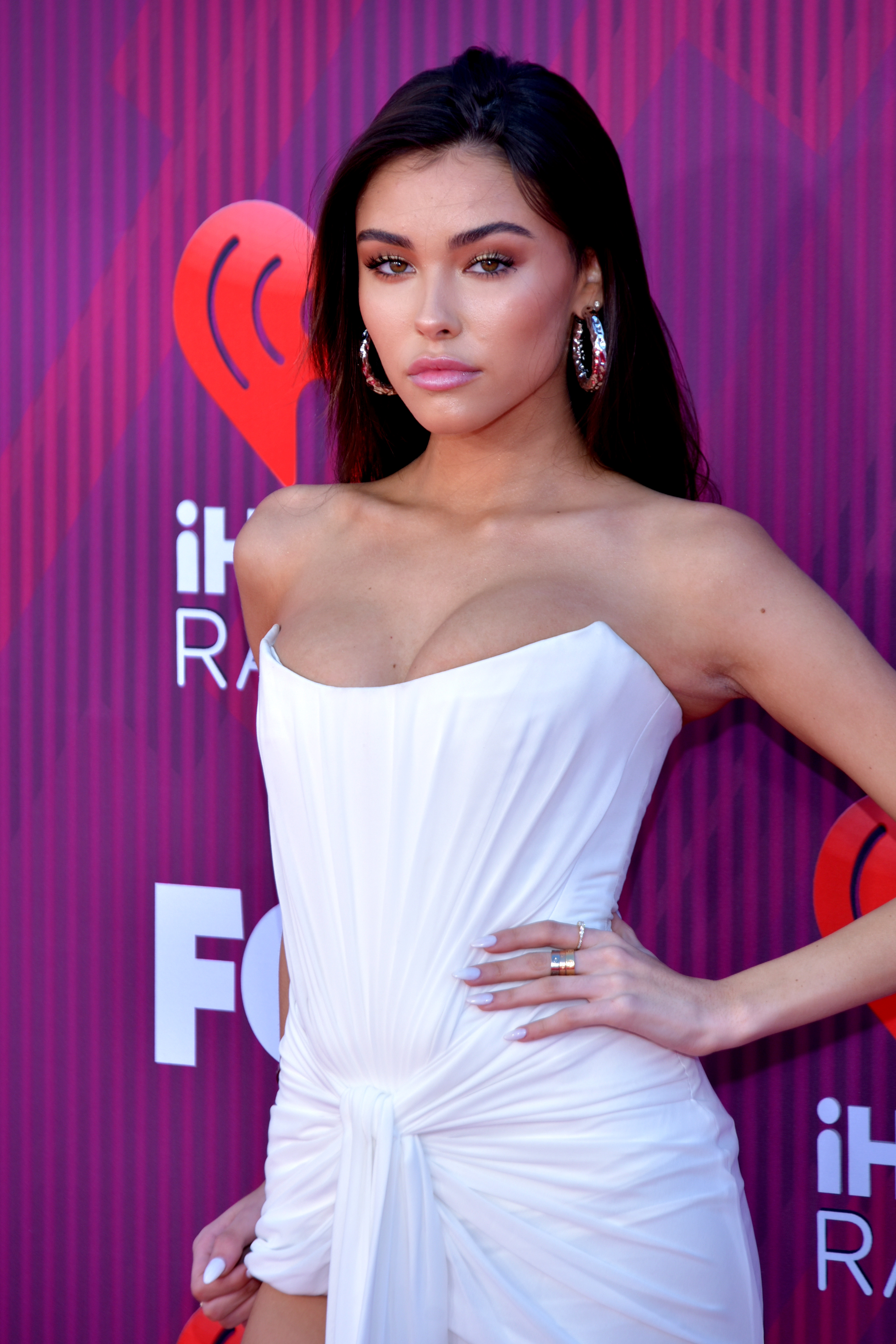
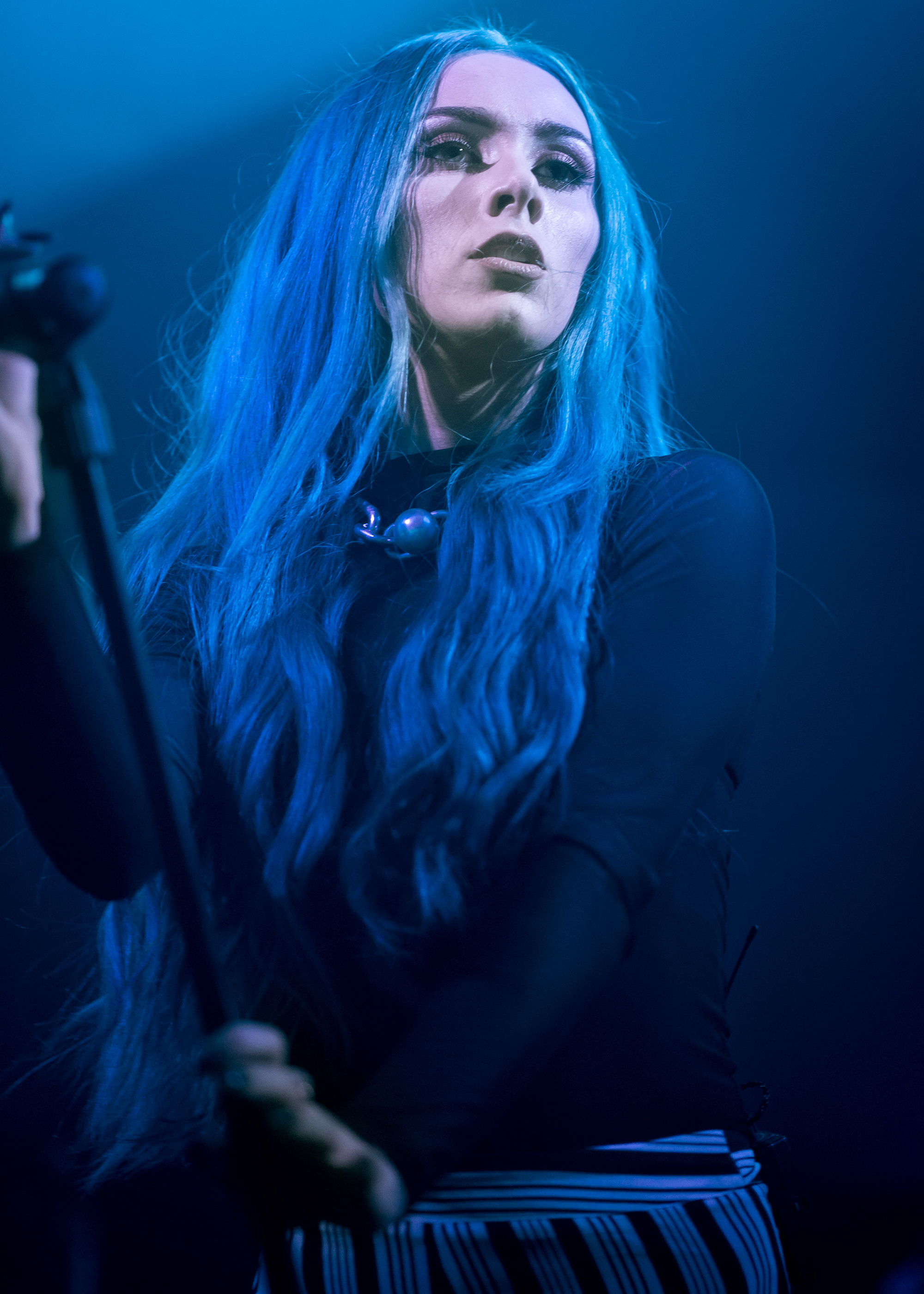
American singers Madison Beer (left) and Jaira Burns (right) voiced the characters Evelynn and Kai'Sa, respectively.
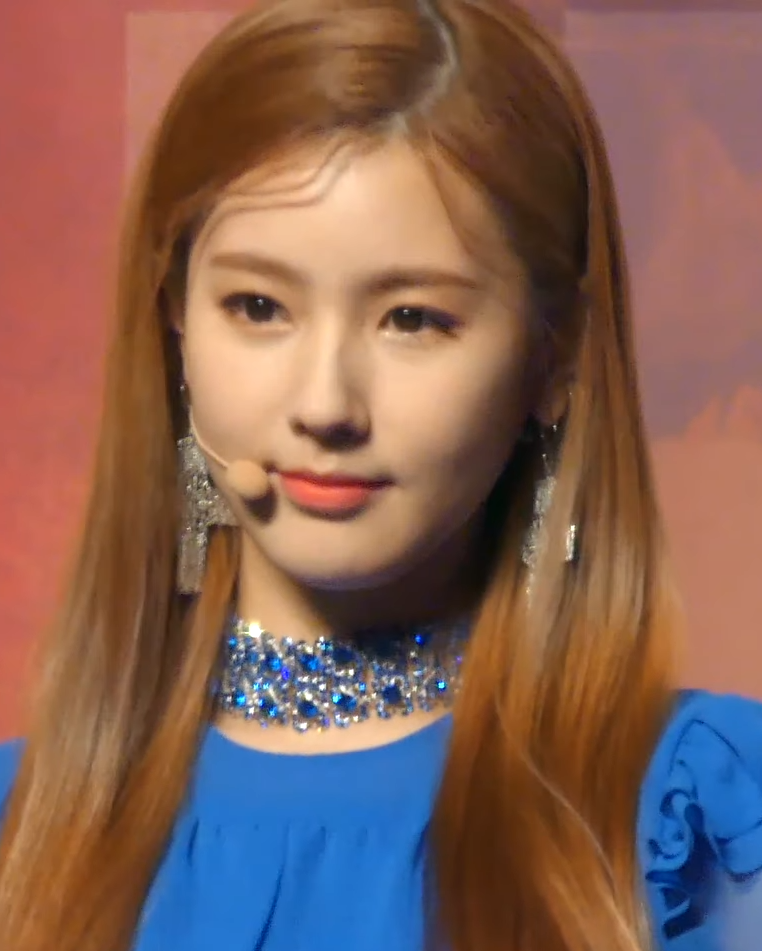
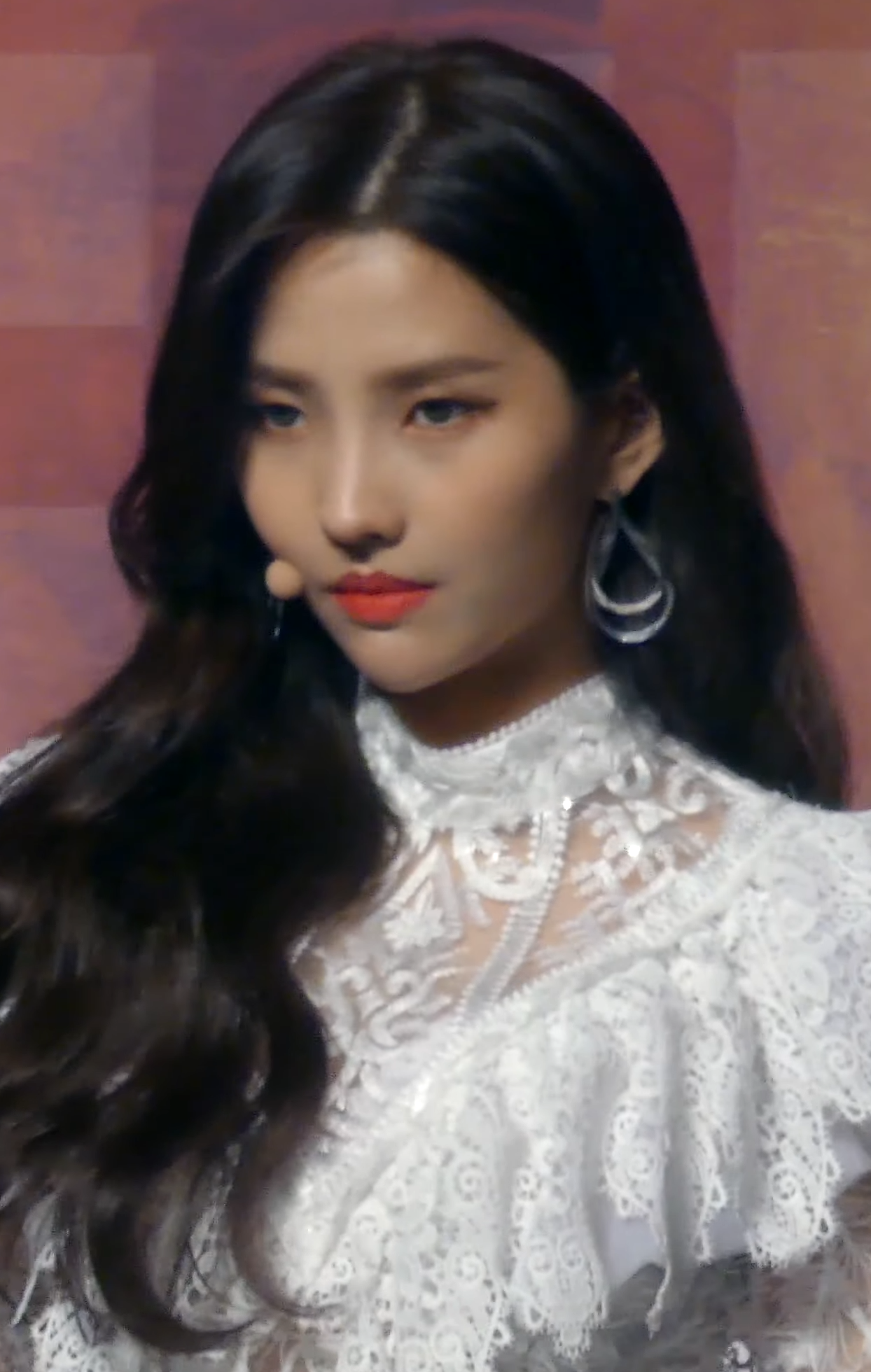
South Korean idols Miyeon (left) and Soyeon (right) of K-pop girl group i-dle voice the characters Ahri and Akali, respectively.

K/DA was unveiled in the 2018 League of Legends World Championship Opening Ceremony in Incheon on November 3, 2018, with the release of their debut single "Pop/Stars". It is a bilingual song with both K-pop and American pop influences, with vocals in English by Madison Beer and Jaira Burns, and in both English and Korean by Soyeon and Miyeon. During the ceremony, Beer, Burns, Miyeon and Soyeon performed "Pop/Stars" on-stage, whilst augmented reality versions of the characters they voiced sang and danced alongside them. The augmented reality versions of the characters could perform acts a human could not achieve, such as Ahri flying onto the stage, whilst a human singer has "a certain raw human element" that can't yet be captured by a virtual performer.

Viranda Tantula, the creative lead on the project, wrote that "we went into this really wanting to make [the ceremony] a dope 'League' moment for players – albeit one where the fantasy of the champs being in the real world played out in an authentic manner that could live alongside others in their verticals (i.e. song had to be able to stand up to other pop songs, performance had to stand up to other performances, etc.)." The official music video for the song was released on YouTube on the same day. Fortiche, a French animation studio, produced the music video.

According to Sebastien Najand, who composed "Pop/Stars", an all-English demo was trialled at first, followed by a version with significantly more Korean. Ultimately, Najand said that "we wanted to make it a blend of western pop and K-Pop". Patrick Morales, the creative lead behind the "Pop/Stars" music video, said that he wanted K/DA to exist "somewhere between fantasy and reality". The team was initially uncertain of the type of music that would be most suitable for the group, due to amount of variety within the pop music genre. They eventually decided against a cuter, more-idol group based theme in favour of something "modern and edgy" that combines a "bit of street style with a handcrafted feel."

=== In League of Legends ===
K/DA skins of Ahri, Akali, Evelynn and Kai'Sa, depicting the characters as how they appear in the band, are available for purchase in League of Legends. Skins in the game are for cosmetic purposes only, and the K/DA skins cost 1350 RP (RP is the League of Legends in-game currency) which costs around US$10 to purchase. The Prestige skins were available by completing special missions in-game, but can now only be acquired through skin rerolls or purchased with mythic essence when they are "unvaulted".

=== Music ===
The popularity of K/DA's debut with "Pop/Stars" led Riot to release a five-track extended play (EP) titled All Out, new skins inspired on its artwork, and music videos in 2020. Miyeon, Soyeon, Beer, and Burns reprised their singing roles on some of the EP's songs. Alternative vocalists were also featured – Nayeon, Sana, and Jihyo as Ahri; Chaeyoung as Akali; Kim Petras, Annika Wells, and Bea Miller as Evelynn; and Wolftyla, Aluna Francis, and Bekuh Boom as Kai'Sa. The character Seraphine appeared on the EP as a guest vocalist, with Lexie Liu providing the singing voice.

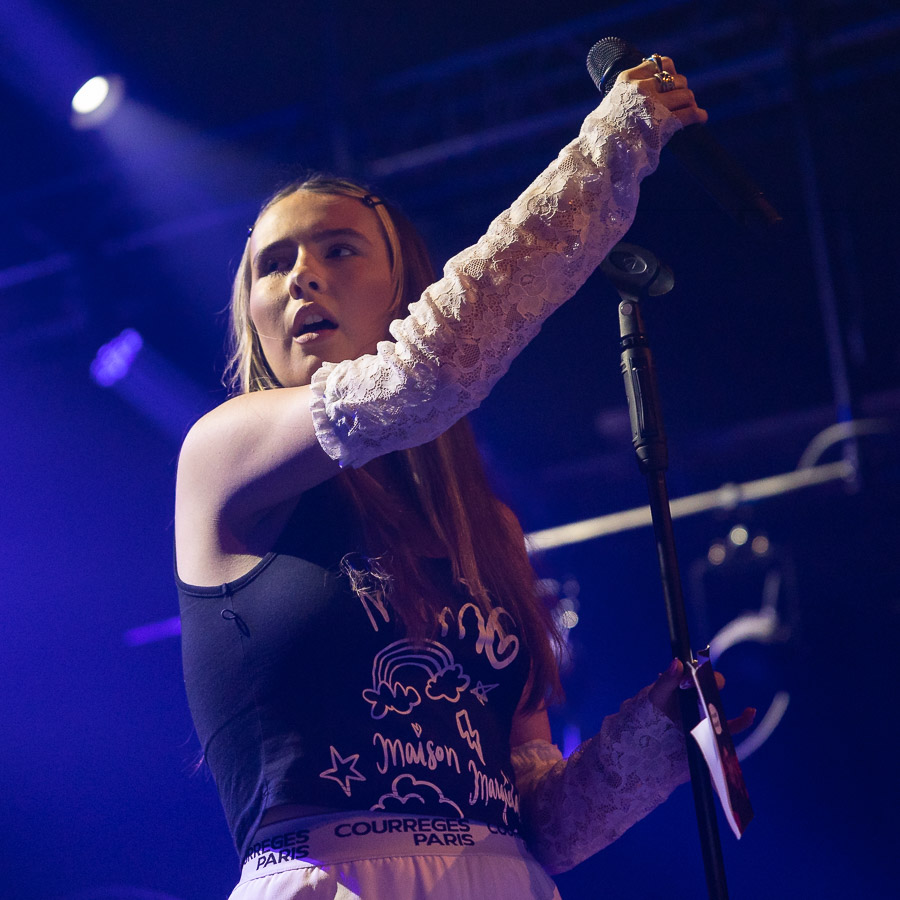
As of Firestarter (2026), singers Sophie Powers (left) and Mimi Webb (right) voice the characters Evelynn and Kai'Sa, respectively.

A second EP, Firestarter, was released in October 2026, lead by the title track as lead single on October 18. Miyeon and Soyeon reprise their singing roles and are joined by newcomers Sophie Powers and Mimi Webb, respectively replacing Beer and Burns as Evelynn and Kai'Sa. When asked about the change in the group's singing roster, Riot Games Principal Brand Manager Alex Shahmiri stated that they appreciate previous collaborators and it is "never about replacing them – it's more about diversifying the pool of artists who can embody each one of these characters". Shahmiri also commented that the return of K/DA was not a result of the impact of the animated film KPop Demon Hunters (2025), as the team had "always believed in virtual groups" and had begun planning the return in early 2025. He described it as "a bit of an all-boats-rise moment" and said that "in a way, [the film] opened a door for new audiences to discover K/DA".

The animation studio Fortiche returned to produce the music video for the title track. Fortiche creative director Marietta Ren explained that the use of coffins in the music video was a reference to the fact the group has not "been there for a long time" and "a little wink" acknowledging the fan meme that they had become skeletons while waiting for K/DA's return. The song "Girls" features DJ Sona, another virtual artist created for League of Legends; the music video released in November 2026. Also in November 2026, six previously released K/DA music videos were included in the Netflix special League of Legends: Music Video Collection – K-pop & More. The special also included music videos from other League of Legends virtual bands such as Heartsteel and True Damage. On November 14, K/DA and True Damage performed at the 2026 League of Legends World Championship.

=== Other appearances ===
Similar to League of Legends, K/DA appear in the spin-off game Wild Rift as skins. It is also notable that the game received the champions the same day that the All Out skins released in October 2020.

In Legends of Runeterra, K/DA All Out was released as special board that can play 3 of their songs. Also, each member and the League of Legends champion Seraphine appear as unique cards in the card game.

In Teamfight Tactics, for the game's 10th set Remix Rumble the roster of champions were primarily drawn from the League of Legends music-based skins, including all of the main members of K/DA as well as Seraphine. Furthermore, to supplement the group of champions with existing music skins, Riot created several new music-themed unit skins exclusively for the set. These included skins for League of Legends champions Lillia and Neeko, recasting them as "Superfans" of K/DA.

Three K/DA songs are featured on Ubisoft's Just Dance series. "Drum Go Dum" is featured in Just Dance 2021 as a free limited-time gift, and was later released to the Unlimited subscription service. The in-game routine uses some moves from the official choreography by Bailey Sok, performed by the K/DA members in their All Out outfits. For Just Dance 2022, "Pop/Stars" is featured in the main tracklist, with the coaches bearing the outfits from the original music video. "More" is featured in Just Dance 2023 Edition with two different routines, one with the coaches in their All Out outfits and the other with Seraphine in her bedroom backdrop from the original music video.

In October 2026, Riot Games and Louis Vuitton published Tempo Point Friday as part of the Louis Vuitton's Travel Book collection. The book imagines 24 hours of the K/DA members' lives.

== Conception and creation ==
The name "K/DA" is an in-game term in League of Legends that refers to a player's kills, deaths, and assists. The creation of K/DA was based in part on the desire of Riot Games, League's developers to "see their company more as a full-fledged music label in the future". Toa Dunn, head of Riot's music division, claimed in an interview with Variety that "[K/DA] was the most involved music project we've ever done".

According to Tantula, "We believe there's a huge overlap between League of Legends, esports overall and the music industry", and as a result, they invested "in building [their] internal music team with both an artist focused creative studio full of composers, songwriters and producers, as well as people who can perform all the services that you would see at a standard music label, such as distribution, A&R and promo." Patrick Morales (creative lead behind the "Pop/Stars" music video), Janelle Jimenez (the lead designer behind the K/DA skins) and Toa Dunn (the head of the Riot Music Group) were the main creators of K/DA. The dances were choreographed by Ellen Kim, Bailey Sok, Stevie Doré and Eileen Harman. 4Minute also served as a source of inspiration behind K/DA. For singing "Pop/Stars", Madison Beer was brought on early, and Jaira Burns followed. As many at Riot were fans of (G)I-dle and liked "the attitude they brought to the song, especially the rap section", Miyeon and Soyeon were brought on as well.

The characters were chosen from League of Legends' character list based on whether players would realistically see them as "popstars". According to Patrick Morales, Ahri was the first character to be chosen for K/DA, due to her previous appearances in League of Legends-related music as "Pop Star Ahri" back in 2013. Subsequently, with Ahri being a "beautiful, charming leader"-type character, Evelynn was chosen to contrast to that, by "being the wild and provocative diva of the group". As Akali's character was being reworked at the time, Morales included her into the band as he liked the "rebellious spirit" of the character. Kai'Sa was included due to a recommendation from skins lead Janelle Jimenez, as she wanted a "strong but silent loner who expressed herself on stage through her movements".

The team also wanted diversity in the characters chosen, where each character has a well-defined archetype that allows viewers to easily identify their favourite K/DA member. According to Jimenez, "Pop groups tend to have a formula where each member has their own unique personality and style. I approached this like looking at classic anime team where you have the leader, the shy one, the feisty one, etc." Furthermore, they also wanted to ensure that the characters chosen had differing roles in the game. "Pop/Stars" was written with these archetypes in mind. For example, a rap section was included in the song as Akali was envisioned to be the rapper, and the pre-chorus was designed to be sung by Ahri.

== Members ==
The members of K/DA consist of four characters from the League of Legends video game:

- Ahri (voiced by Laura Post, singing voices provided by Miyeon, Nayeon, Sana and Jihyo) is a nine-tailed fox mage in League of Legends and one of its most well-known characters. In lore she is a Vastaya, a chimeric race of humanoid beast creatures, in Ahri's case a fox-type of Vastaya known as Vesani. In-game, she is a mage-assassin hybrid usually played in the mid lane. Her main weapon is her orb of deception, which she can command to damage enemies and then return to her. She can also heal herself by hurting others, launch 'foxfire' missiles towards her enemies, charm enemies to immobilize them and use her ultimate ability 'Spirit Rush'; to rapidly dash up to three times. She is also well known as one of Faker's most played champions; in 2024, she was given two commemorative skins to celebrate Faker's induction into the Hall of Legends. In K/DA, Ahri serves as the leader and founder of K/DA, as well as one of the main vocalists along with Evelynn. Her All Out solo song is "I'll Show You". According to Miyeon, she started learning more about League of Legends and actually played the game as Ahri to better understand her character. Miyeon was invited to visit Riot Headquarters in 2020 along with Soyeon to play League of Legends as their represented characters and skins (Soyeon as K/DA Akali, Miyeon as K/DA Ahri). Ahri also appears as a playable character in Ruined King: A League of Legends Story.
- Akali (voiced by Laura Bailey and Krizia Bajos in League of Legends, voiced in K/DA interviews and promotional videos by Shannon Williams, singing voice provided by Soyeon and Chaeyoung) is a Ninja assassin character usually played in either the mid lane or top lane. In lore, Akali hails from Ionia formerly as a part of the Kinkou Order under its grandmaster Shen. After witnessing the atrocities committed by Noxus and the Kinkou's restrained response to the invasion of Ionia led to her abandoning the Order to defend her homeland in a direct fashion, becoming a rogue ninja. In game, her abilities involve creating clouds of smoke to become invisible, as well as throwing shurikens at opponents while hitting them with a kama and kunai. She is very mobile with abilities that allow her to dash rapidly and execute enemies with her ultimate. Her All Out solo song is "The Baddest". In K/DA, Akali is the main rapper of the group. Soyeon said she tried to "feel like Akali and move as if I were Akali" during the motion capture for "Pop/Stars". Akali is also a member of True Damage, another virtual group formed by League of Legends characters. Soyeon also played the game on two separate occasions; first alone on a livestream, and then a few months later with Miyeon at Riot Headquarters in 2020 as their represented characters and skins (Soyeon as K/DA Akali, Miyeon as K/DA Ahri).
- Evelynn (voiced by Mara Junot, singing voices provided by Madison Beer, Kim Petras, Annika Wells, Bea Miller, Sophie Powers, Sorana and Royal & The Serpent) is a sadistic Demon assassin usually played in the jungle. In lore, she is a primordial demon who takes on forms that attracts her victims. At the height of her target's pleasure, she unleashes her true form and preys on their suffering as a result. In game, her noteworthy ability involves her being permanently invisible to enemies (shadow form) when outside of combat or outside of a vision range. This allows her to sneak up on enemies and appear from her shadow-form, using her charm spell to immobilize them, followed by quickly eliminating them with her combo and execution-like ultimate spell. In K/DA, Evelynn serves as one of the main vocalists along with Ahri. Her All Out solo song is "Villain". Some facts about Evelynn in the K/DA universe: She is known for her uncompromising vision, rich vocals, and "bad girl" attitude. Before K/DA, she had disagreements in other musical groups before working alone to write her own music before reconnecting with Ahri to create K/DA. Evelynn is very mysterious about her diet and workouts and usually declines to comment on her routine. She has a collection of very fast cars. She is close to few people and very protective of them. She has been romantically linked with several missing male celebrities but never confirmed a relationship. Evelynn has stated she takes inspiration from Karthus (another playable character in League of Legends who stars in the music group Pentakill).
- Kai'Sa (voiced by Natasha Loring, singing voices provided by Jaira Burns, Wolftyla, Aluna Francis, Bekuh Boom, and Mimi Webb) is a burst marksman and usually played in the bottom lane. In lore, Kai'Sa is the daughter of another champion, Kassadin, who was lost to the Void, an alternate plane of existence connected to Runeterra filled with many unspeakable horrors amidst the utter nothingness and darkness. To survive, she merged with a Voidborn, a creature of the Void, becoming an apex predator herself and has since returned to Runeterra not fully Voidborn, but remarkably less human. In game, Kai'sa can either snipe enemies from afar or dash close to them and fire missiles from magical cannons floating above her shoulders. She also has an ability to dodge attacks, which can also grant her invisibility once she is powerful enough. In K/DA, Kai'Sa is the main dancer of the group. She also rapped in "The Baddest" and sang in "Pop/Stars", "More", and her All Out solo song, "Drum Go Dum".

=== Guest feature ===
- Seraphine (voiced by Michele Panu, singing voices provided by Lexie Liu and Jasmine Clarke) is a champion in League of Legends who can either be played in the mid lane as a burst mage or in the bottom lane as an enchantress support (alongside a marksman, such as Kai'sa). Her entire character and abilities are based around music. In the League of Legends universe, she is a singing superstar in the city of Piltover, with her floating stage that is powered by a crystal. In the K/DA universe, she is a Chinese-American living in Los Angeles, and sings in both English and Chinese. After her singing on social media gained the attention of the K/DA members, she had a collaboration on K/DA's 2020 title track "More", and helped produce K/DA's first extended play, All Out. Seraphine is not a permanent member of K/DA. In the real world, she has Instagram and X accounts where she details the journey from her start as an indie artist to her rise as a pop star. She also has a SoundCloud profile containing several covers posted in late 2020, consisting of "Childhood Dreams" by ARY, "Pop/Stars" by K/DA, and "All the Things She Said" by Russian duo T.A.T.u. Along with her covers, she has also released her own song "Made Me This Way".

== Reception ==
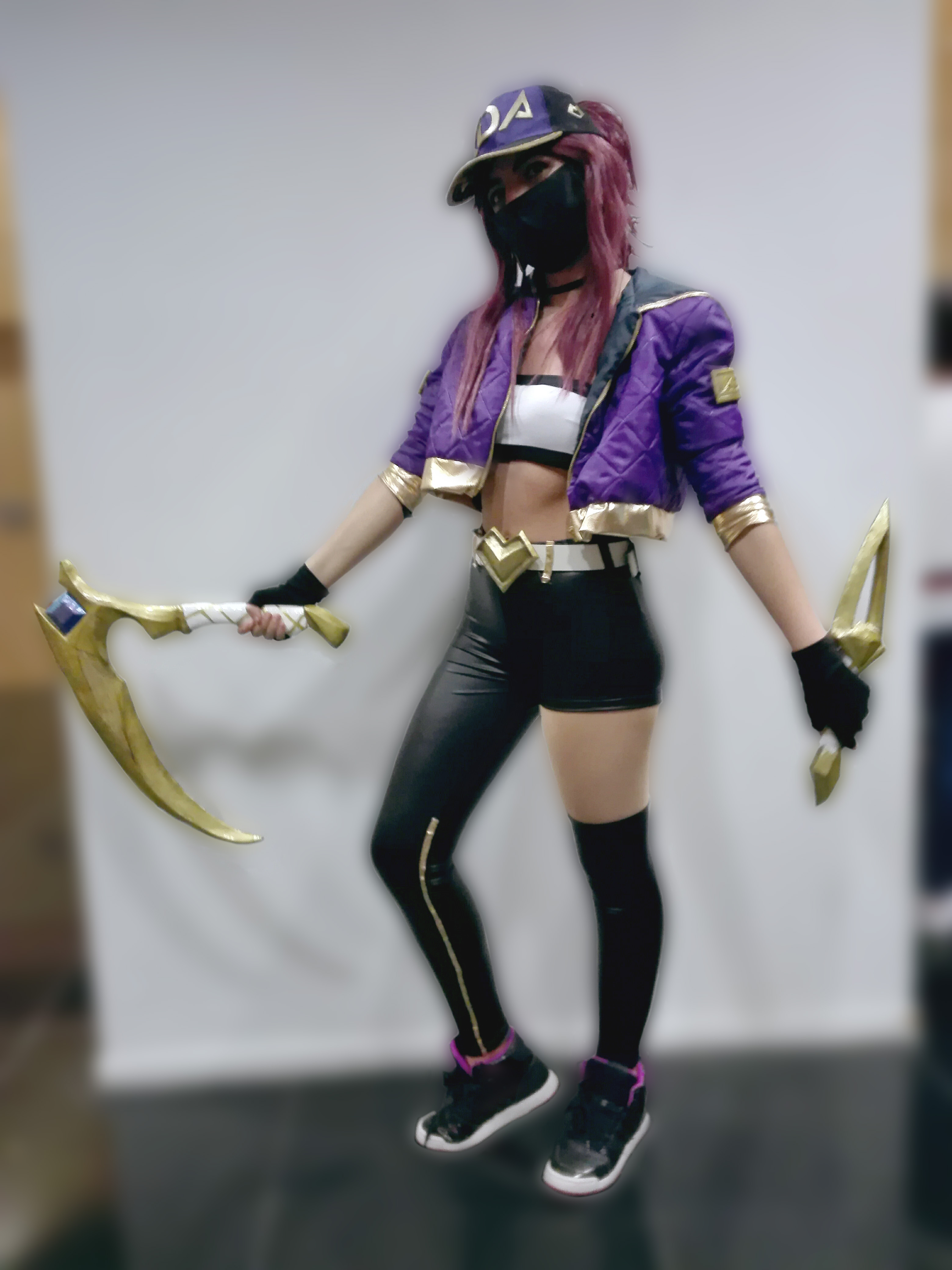
The K/DA characters have become popular subjects of cosplay. Pictured, an Akali cosplayer during the "Pop/Stars" era.

K/DA has achieved significant popularity both within and beyond the League of Legends community. Writing for Dot Esports, Aaron Mickunas noted that "It didn't take long for K/DA [...] to completely flood the game's fan community. The group's members have been promoted throughout Reddit, Twitter, the game's forums, and Universe, League of Legends' lore platform." "Pop/Stars" reached number 1 on Billboard's World Digital Song Sales chart in November 2018, making K/DA the fourth K-pop girl group to do so, and only the fifth female act overall, leading Jeff Benjamin of Billboard to write that "all signs point to Esports very possibly shaping what can make a hit song in the future." The song sold 9,000 copies in its opening week, according to Nielsen Music. It also ranked 10th on the Pop Digital Song Sales chart and 30th on Digital Song Sales overall, as well as charting first on Apple Music's K-Pop charts and fifth for pop music overall.

The "Pop/Stars" music video received 5 million views within 24 hours of its upload to YouTube, breaking the record at the time for the most viewed K-Pop debut group music video within 24 hours of publishing, a record previously held by "La Vie en Rose" by South Korean-Japanese girl group Iz*One. The video continued to garner views, receiving over 13 million views within 48 hours, when the video trended on the site. On April 2, 2019, the music video reached 200 million views. Benjamin Pu of NBC News wrote that "The song's popularity highlights just how much of a cultural force video games have become in South Korea and around the world."

K/DA's popularity has resulted in a large amount of fanart being created of the group. This includes a large amount of art featuring Akali and Evelynn, as the two were paired up in the "Pop/Stars" music video, with Akali being the most popular. Cosplay of the characters has also been popular, including when Cloud9's League of Legends esports team cosplayed as the K/DA characters in April 2019. Professional League player Sneaky also cosplayed as K/DA Kai'Sa, and after he posted images of the cosplay on Twitter, the tweets received over 4,500 retweets and 23,700 likes within two days. Shannon Liao of The Verge wrote that through K/DA, "Riot Games has tapped into an audience bigger than the typical League fan base", with ex-players and new players joining the game "because the [Pop/Stars] video looks so cool." Riot's Patrick Morales agreed, noting K/DA's impact goes beyond just that of League fandom, with "one recurring comment that I tend to see on YouTube and social media about the music video is that they're "normally not into League/K-pop/gaming, but K/DA is the exception".

Steven Asarch of Newsweek compared K/DA to the K-pop girl group Blackpink. Lucas Lockyer of Dazed called K/DA a mix of "Girls' Generation meets Little Mix and Hatsune Miku" and asked if the band was "leading the virtual pop future", where "what was essentially some creative promotional marketing could be the forefront of an interesting new branch of pop [...] Perhaps with developed AR technology, the characters could tour in hologram form without the physical appearance of the singers behind them." When asked about whether this would be possible with a holographic concert or augmented reality technology Viranda Tantula replied that "that could be super fun. But before we'd even consider that, we'd realistically want to make sure there was enough quality music to support it, and a good reason for us, a games company and esports league, to try that out." "Pop/Stars" was also added as a song to the virtual reality rhythm game Beat Saber as a free download.

Following the release of Firestarter (2026), Mollie Taylor of PC Gamer wrote that "Riot Music found the height of its success towards the end of the 2010s" and "has barely done a thing with any" of their virtual groups since then, noting "K/DA has lain dormant for the last six years" and "True Damage and Heartsteel were one-hit wonders". Taylor commented that while True Damage and Heartsteel both recently released singles, "it feels like Riot was saving up all its hype (and perhaps budget) for the return of K/DA". She praised the Firestarter EP, highlighting that it "boasts immense production value", benefits from the return of Soyeon and Miyeon who give "K/DA that much-needed familiar sound", and a Fortiche produced music video.

== Discography ==
=== Extended plays ===
Title	EP details	Peak chart positions					
Title	EP details	CAN	FRA	NZ	SPA	US	US World
All Out	Released: November 6, 2020; Label: Riot Games; Stone; Formats: Digital download	65	186	36	54	175	5
Firestarter	Released: October 21, 2026; Label: Riot Games; Formats: CD; LP; digital download; Track listing: 1. "Firestarter" (with Miyeon, Soyeon, Sophie Powers, and Mimi Webb); 2. "Watch Me" (with Sophie Powers and Mimi Webb); 3. "Never Going Back" (with Miyeon and Soyeon); 4. "Girls" (with DJ Sona, Sophie Powers, Sorana, and Royal & the Serpent)	—	—	—	—	—	6

=== Singles ===
List of singles, with selected chart positions, showing year released and album name
Title	Year	Peak chart positions										Sales	Certifications	Album
Title	Year	CAN	FRA Dig.	KOR	MYS	NZ Hot	UK Dig.	UK Indie	US Dig.	US World	WW	Sales	Certifications	Album
"Pop/Stars" (with (G)I-dle, Madison Beer, and Jaira Burns)	2018	— (Note: "Pop/Stars" did not enter the Canadian Hot 100, but peaked at number 30 on the Hot Canada Digital Song Sales chart.)	86	39	16	6	75	17	30	1	—	US: 9,000	RIAA: Platinum	Non-album single
"The Baddest" (with (G)I-dle, Bea Miller, and Wolftyla)	2020	— (Note: "The Baddest" did not enter the Canadian Hot 100, but peaked at number 38 on the Hot Canada Digital Song Sales chart.)	—	178	16	6	74	18	28	1	—	—N/a		All Out
"More" (with Madison Beer, (G)I-dle, Lexie Liu, Jaira Burns, and Seraphine)	2020	— (Note: "More" did not enter the Canadian Hot 100, but peaked at number 48 on the Hot Canada Digital Song Sales chart.)	—	— (Note: "More" did not enter Gaon Digital Chart, but debuted and peaked at number 96 on Gaon Download Chart.)	18	9	—	23	—	1	125	—N/a		All Out
"Firestarter" (with Miyeon, Soyeon, Sophie Powers, and Mimi Webb)	2026	76	—	—	—	6	—	—	—	—	87	—N/a		Firestarter

=== Other charted songs ===
List of singles, with selected chart positions, showing year released and album name
Title	Year	Peak chart positions		Album
Title	Year	NZ Hot	US World	Album
"Villain" (with Madison Beer and Kim Petras)	2020	21	5	All Out
"Drum Go Dum" (with Aluna, Wolftyla and Bekuh Boom)	2020	25	6	All Out
"I'll Show You" (with Twice, Bekuh Boom and Annika Wells)	2020	38	10	All Out

== Awards and nominations ==
Year	Award	Category	Nominee/work	Result	Ref.
2019	Game Audio Network Guild Awards	Best Original Song	"Pop/Stars"	Nominated	
2019	11th Shorty Awards	Best in Games	"Pop/Stars"	Won	
2020	QQ Music Boom Boom Awards	Best Visual Idol	K/DA	Won	
2021	Hollywood Music in Media Awards	Outstanding Song – Video Game	"The Baddest"	Won	
2021	Game Audio Network Guild Awards	Best Original Song	"More"	Won	
2021	13th Shorty Awards	Best in Games	"More"	Finalist	
2021	13th Shorty Awards	Best in Video	"More"	Gold	
2021	25th Webby Awards	Video – Music (Branded)	"More"	Won	
