= Sophie Powers =

Canadian singer-songwriter (born 2004)

- Powers in November 2026

Background information
- Also known as: Pixl Girl
- Born: Sophie Anne Luborsky; July 29, 2004 (age 22); Toronto, Ontario, Canada
- Genres: Hyperpop; pop-punk; electropop; hip-hop
- Occupations: Singer; songwriter; fashion designer
- Years active: 2021–present
- Labels: Atlantic; Set Records
- Member of: K/DA
- Website: sophiepowers.com

Sophie Anne Luborsky (born July 29, 2004), known professionally as Sophie Powers, is a Canadian singer, songwriter, and fashion designer. She is known for her genre-blending musical style, combining elements of pop-punk and hyperpop music. She has released two EPs, Red In Revenge (2022) and Glitch: Lvl 1 (2024). In 2025, Powers auditioned in the 23rd season of American Idol by performing a joke song called "STFU" as a marketing stunt.

== Career ==
=== 2021–2022: Early career and Red In Revenge ===
Powers was born in Toronto on July 29, 2004. She began her professional musical career at age 16 with the release of the rock ballad "Lonely Army" on April 30, 2021, through Set Records. That same year, Powers moved from Toronto to Los Angeles.

In 2021, Powers released a cover of "Heart-Shaped Box" by Nirvana. The songs "1 Thing" (featuring Kellin Quinn of Sleeping with Sirens), "Life Goes On!!", "Greed" (featuring De'wayne), "Clearview" (featuring Noahfinnce), and "U Love It" (featuring $atori Zoom) were released as singles and featured on her debut EP, Red In Revenge. The EP was released on May 20, 2022. Powers toured the U.S. with Noahfinnce from May to June 2022. The single "U Love It" was remixed by producer Danny L Harle.

=== 2023–2024: Glitch: Lvl 1 ===
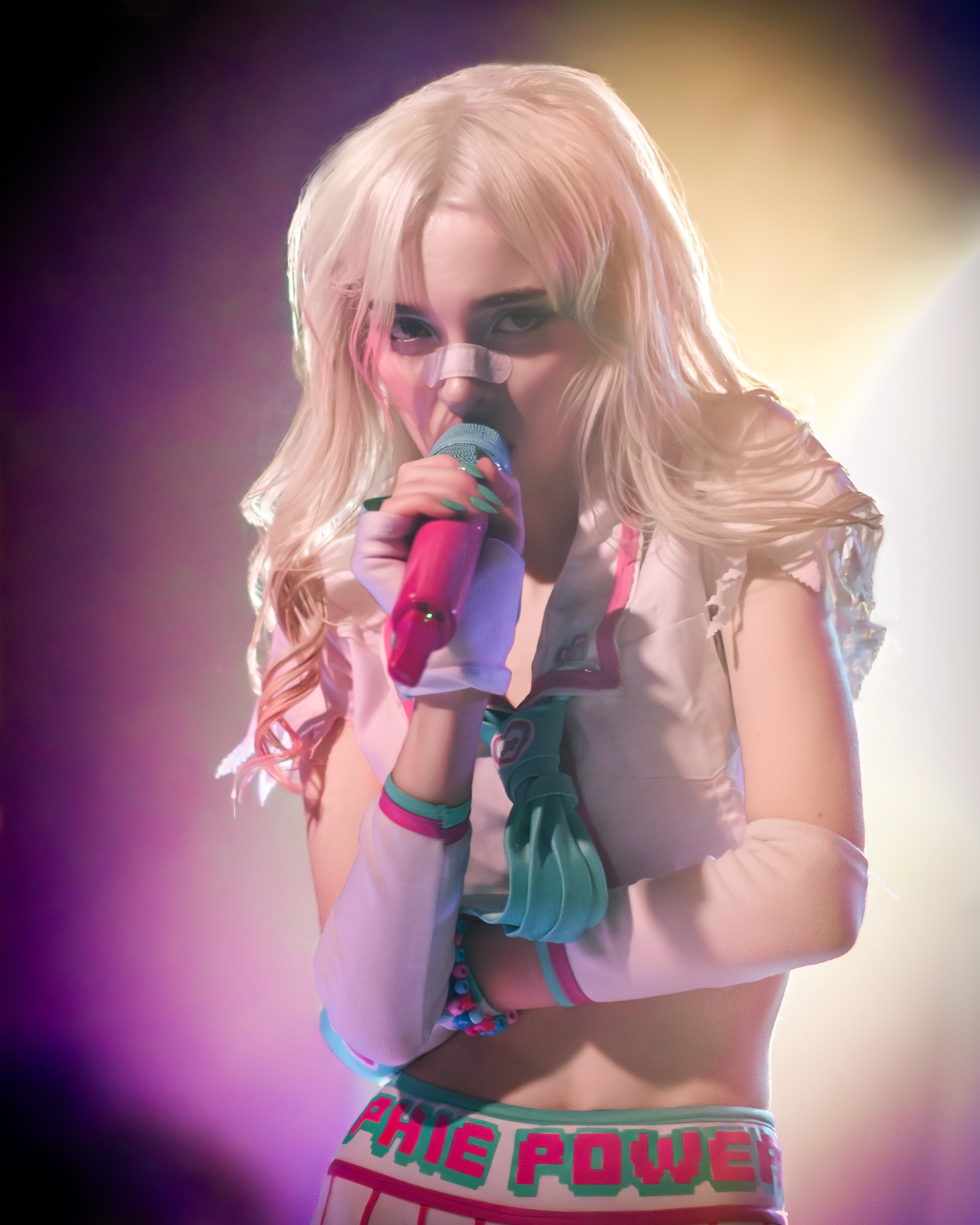
Sophie Powers performing in 2024

In 2023, Powers collaborated with Syko on the single "Lipmosh". In 2023 and 2024, Powers released the singles "Nosebleed", "Bathroom Floor", "Better On Mute" (featuring Chandler Leighton), "Obsessed" (featuring Ashley Sienna), "Woah!!" (featuring kets4eki), and "Awesome" (featuring Baby Tate). These singles were all featured on her second EP, Glitch: Lvl 1, which was released on July 12, 2024. The EP was a departure from the pop-punk of Powers' earlier music, replacing it with hyperpop and glitchpop. Powers supported Glitch: Lvl 1 with her first headlining tour.

In June 2024, Powers also collaborated with New Zealand-based metal singer Vana on the song "PlayBoi." In August 2024, Powers collaborated with Canadian singer and producer Grimes for "Obsessed (Grimes DJ Edit)".

=== 2025–present: American Idol and K-pop collaborations ===
Sophie Powers performing in 2025

In January 2025, Powers released the single "Goals". In February 2025, for Gloomy Bear’s 25th anniversary, Powers released a fashion collection with Gloomy Bear and ACDC Rag that combined a chaotic-cute aesthetic with punk styling. On April 4, 2025, Powers released the single "Move With Me", signaling a departure from the bubblegum aesthetic that represented the Glitch: Lvl 1 EP. On May 16, 2025, Powers released the single "XO", featuring RJ Pasin. On June 20, 2025, Powers released the single "Head Empty No Thoughts".

Also in 2025, Powers participated in the 23rd season of American Idol. Her audition was a marketing stunt in which she performed a joke song called "STFU" in an attempt to drive traffic to her released music. She was featured on an official remix of the Illit song "Jellyous" and co-wrote "Gotcha (Baddest Eros)" for Ive as well as "Reality Hurts" with Nmixx. On September 26, 2025, she released the single "Muddy". On October 31, 2025, Powers released the single, "Spiderwebs".

On December 19, 2025, Powers released the single, "Popoff". On February 26, 2026, she released the Y2K-inspired single "Klepto," a collaboration with Chinese singer and rapper Lexie Liu. On September 18, 2026, Powers released the single "MIA," which explores feelings of isolation caused in part by social media.

In October 2026, Powers provided the singing voice of Evelynn, a character from League of Legends, on three songs by the virtual band K/DA.

== Musical style ==
Powers' music draws from various genres, including hyperpop, pop-punk, electropop, hip-hop, pop rock, glitchpop, alternative pop, and avant-pop, with elements of dance, industrial, and emo.

== Discography ==
=== EPs ===
List of EPs, with selected details
Title	EP details
Red In Revenge	Released: May 20, 2022; Label: Set Records; Formats: CD, LP, digital download
Glitch: Lvl 1	Released: July 12, 2024; Label: Atlantic / TAG Music; Formats: CD, LP, digital download

=== Singles ===
==== As lead artist ====
List of singles as lead artist, showing year released and album name
Title	Year	Album
"Lonely Army"	2021	Non-album single
"1 Thing" (featuring Kellin Quinn)	2021	Red in Revenge
"Life Goes On!!"	2021	Red in Revenge
"Heart-Shaped Box"	2021	Non-album single
"Greed" (featuring De'Wayne)	2021	Red in Revenge
"Clearview" (featuring Noahfinnce)	2021	Red in Revenge
"U Love It" (featuring $atori Zoom)	2022	Red in Revenge
"Break Up on the Weekend"	2022	Red in Revenge
"Nosebleed"	2023	Glitch: Lvl 1
"Bathroom Floor"	2023	Glitch: Lvl 1
"Better on Mute" (featuring Chandler Leighton)	2024	Glitch: Lvl 1
"Obsessed" (featuring Ashley Sienna)	2024	Glitch: Lvl 1
"Woah!!" (featuring kets4eki)	2024	Glitch: Lvl 1
"Awesome" (featuring Baby Tate)	2024	Glitch: Lvl 1
"Obsessed (Grimes DJ Edit)" (with Grimes)	2024	Non-album singles
"Goals"	2025	Non-album singles
"Move with Me"	2025	Non-album singles
"XO" (with RJ Pasin)	2025	Non-album singles
"Head Empty No Thoughts"	2025	Non-album singles
"Muddy"	2025	Non-album singles
"Spiderwebs"	2025	Non-album singles
"Popoff"	2025	Non-album singles
"Klepto" (with Lexie Liu)	2026	Non-album singles
"MIA"	2026	Non-album singles
"Dirty White Tee"	2026	Non-album singles

==== As featured artist ====
List of singles as featured artist, showing year released and album name
Title	Year	Album
"Don't Waste My Time" (Dillon Francis and Space Rangers featuring Sophie Powers)	2024	Non-album singles
"PlayBoi" (Vana with Sophie Powers)	2024	Non-album singles
"Jellyous" (Illit featuring Sophie Powers)	2025	Non-album singles
"Firestarter" (K/DA featuring Miyeon, Soyeon, Sophie Powers and Mimi Webb)	2026	Firestarter

=== Guest appearances ===
List of non-single guest appearances, showing other performing artists, year released and album name
Title	Year	Other artist(s)	Album
"When Life Gives You Lemons"	2023	Lil Lotus	Nosebleeder

=== Songwriting credits ===
List of songs written or co-written for other artists, showing year released and album name
Title	Year	Artist	Album
"Gotcha (Baddest Eros)"	2025	Ive	Ive Secret
"Reality Hurts"	2025	Nmixx	Blue Valentine

== Awards and nominations ==
=== Berlin Music Video Awards ===
The Berlin Music Video Awards is an international festival that promotes the art of music videos.

Year	Nominated work	Award	Result	Ref.
2026	"Move With Me"	Best Experimental	Nominated	
