= The Baddest (K/DA song) =

2020 single by K/DA

Single by (G)I-dle, Bea Miller, and Wolftyla as K/DA

from the EP All Out
- Language: English; Korean
- Released: August 27, 2020
- Genre: K-pop; trap
- Length: 2:42
- Label: Riot Games; Stone
- Songwriters: Rebecca Johnson; Sebastien Najand; Lydia Paek; Minji Kim
- Producer: Riot Music Team

K/DA singles chronology
| "Pop/Stars" (2018) | "The Baddest" (2020) | "More" (2020) |

(G)I-dle singles chronology
| "Dumdi Dumdi" (2020) | "The Baddest" (2020) | "More" (2020) |

Bea Miller singles chronology
| "That Bitch" (2019) | "The Baddest" (2020) | "Wisdom Teeth" (2020) |

Wolftyla singles chronology
| "Butterflies" (2020) | "The Baddest" (2020) |

Lyric video
- "The Baddest" on YouTube

"The Baddest" (stylized in all caps) is a song by virtual K-pop girl group K/DA. It was released on August 27, 2020, as the pre-release single from their debut extended play All Out. It is K/DA's first song since "Pop/Stars" in 2018. The song was composed by Riot Music Team in collaboration with Bekuh Boom. The song was accompanied by a lyric video which was uploaded to League of Legends official YouTube channel on the same day.

== Background and release ==
K/DA launched their official Twitter and Instagram account on August 20. Simultaneously, Riot Games revealed the single image of the K/DA logo, including the comeback's date and the titled of their pre-release song with the phrase "YOUTUBE PREMIERE 8.27.2020 12 PM PT #KDA #CALLINGALLBLADES #KDAISBACK #COMEBACK #THEBADDEST". Starting August 24, 2020, K/DA individual images with new appearance and member introduction were released from Ahri the Queen, Evelynn the Diva, Kai’Sa the Dancer to Akali the Rebel. Ahead of its release, League of Legends' Shazam page revealed Wolftyla and Bea Miller would take over the roles of Kai’Sa and Evelynn; original artists Jaira Burns and Madison Beer reprised their roles in later K/DA songs.

== Composition ==
In terms of music notation, "The Baddest" was composed using 4/4 common time, written in the key of E-flat major with a tempo of 150 beats per minute, and a running time of 2:42 minutes. Soyeon and Miyeon of (G)I-dle, Bea Miller, and Wolftyla provide vocals for the song.

== Critical reception ==
Mike Stubbs from Forbes wrote in his article that he "only listened to it a handful of times and it is already stuck in [his] head!" Shacknews's TJ Denzer was impressed by the music video, saying that "it brings back the pop stylized versions of in-game champions Ahri, Evelynn, Akali, and Kai’Sa in full and fashionable form to deliver The Baddest", and described the song as "a cornucopia of good vocals and visuals set to an entrancing beat". League of Legends European Championship (LEC) caster Daniel Drakos didn't really like the song upon first hearing it on Twitter. Instead, he recommends listening to The Baddest on music streaming platforms like Spotify and Apple Music for better sound quality. Meanwhile, another LEC caster, Indiana "Froskurinn" Black, was fond of Kai'Sa's lines "I came to slay back and I'm better and ready to stay."

"The Baddest" was included in Hyperbae's Best K-pop Songs and Music Videos of 2020.

== Track listing ==
- Download and streaming
1. "The Baddest" – 2:42
2. "The Baddest" (inst.) – 2:42

== Credits and personnel ==
Credits are adapted from Melon and Tidal.

- Vocals – Soyeon and Miyeon of (G)I-dle, Bea Miller and Wolftyla
- Riot Music Team – production, composer, songwriting, vocal production, mix engineer, mastering engineer
- Sebastien Najand – composer
- Bekuh Boom – songwriting, additional vocals
- Lydia Paek – Korean translation
- Minji Kim – Korean translation
- Oscar Free – vocal production

== Lyric video ==
On August 27, a live countdown started at 12 PM PT on League of Legends's official YouTube channel, with nearly 180,000 viewers live on during its premiere. In 10 minutes, the video surpassed 500,000+ views, and reached 4 million views in 8 hours. The video was directed by Riot Games and Jordan Taylor Studios who had previously worked for Pitch Perfect 2, Netflix's documentary film Kingdom of Us and Joey Badass' "Unorthodox". The next day, Riot Korea released a behind-the-scenes video of (G)I-dle's recording session of the song.

== Accolades ==
Awards
| Year | Award | Category | Result | Ref. |
|---|---|---|---|---|
| 2021 | Hollywood Music in Media Awards | Outstanding Song – Video Game | Won | |

Year-end lists
| Critic/Publication | List | Rank | Ref. |
|---|---|---|---|
| Hypebae | Best K-Pop Songs and Music Videos of 2020 | —N/a | |

== Charts ==
| Chart (2020) | Peak position |
|---|---|
| Canada Hot Digital Song Sales (Billboard) | 30 |
| Czech Republic Singles Digital (ČNS IFPI) | 62 |
| Greece (IFPI) | 62 |
| Hungary (Single Top 40) | 21 |
| Hungary (Stream Top 40) | 16 |
| Lithuania (AGATA) | 70 |
| Malaysia (RIM) | 16 |
| New Zealand Hot Singles (RMNZ) | 6 |
| Scottish Singles Sales (Official Charts) | 70 |
| Singapore (RIAS) | 7 |
| South Korea (Gaon) | 178 |
| UK Download (Official Charts Company) | 74 |
| UK Indie (Official Charts) | 18 |
| US Digital Songs (Billboard) | 28 |
| US World Digital Song Sales (Billboard) | 1 |

== Release history ==
| Region | Release date | Format | Distributor | Ref. |
|---|---|---|---|---|
| Various | August 27, 2020 | Digital download; streaming | Riot Games | |
| South Korea | August 29, 2020 | Digital download; streaming | Riot Games; Stone | |

== See also ==
- List of K-pop songs on the Billboard charts
