= Pop/Stars =

2018 debut single by K/DA

Single by (G)I-dle, Madison Beer, and Jaira Burns as K/DA
- Language: English; Korean
- Released: November 3, 2018
- Genre: K-pop; trap
- Length: 3:11
- Label: Riot Games; FUGA; Stone (Korea)
- Songwriters: Sebastien Najand; Lydia Paek; Jessica Ashley Karpov
- Producer: Riot Music Team

K/DA singles chronology
| "Pop/Stars" (2018) | "The Baddest" (2020) |

(G)I-dle singles chronology
| "Hann (Alone)" (2018) | "Pop/Stars" (2018) | "Senorita" (2019) |

Madison Beer singles chronology
| "Home with You" (2018) | "Pop/Stars" (2018) | "Hurts Like Hell" (2018) |

Jaira Burns singles chronology
| "Everybody Else" (2018) | "Pop/Stars" (2018) | "Numb" (2019) |

Music video
- "Pop/Stars" on YouTube

"Pop/Stars" is a song by virtual K-pop girl group K/DA. It was released as a single on November 3, 2018, as promotion for the 2018 League of Legends World Championship. The single became popular with one of the fastest viewership records for its music video on YouTube. Soyeon and Miyeon from (G)I-dle, Madison Beer and Jaira Burns provided vocals for the song and represented the group as its human counterpart in the live performance at the finals of the tournament.

Commercially, the song topped the World Digital Songs chart, making K/DA the fourth K-pop girl group to top the chart and fifth female act overall. The song has been certified platinum by the Recording Industry Association of America (RIAA), making K/DA and (G)I-dle the first K-pop girl groups in history to achieve this milestone.

== Background and composition ==
K/DA consists of four virtual characters, whose vocals were provided by Soyeon and Miyeon from (G)I-dle, Madison Beer and Jaira Burns. "Pop/Stars" has a length of three minutes and eleven seconds and a tempo of 170 beats per minute. It is a bilingual song, featuring vocals in English by Beer and Burns, and in both English and Korean by Soyeon and Miyeon. The song was composed by Sébastien Najand.

== Critical reception ==
Julia Alexander of The Verge called the song "a straight up banger."

== Music video ==
The music video for "Pop/Stars" was released alongside the single and was produced by French studio Fortiche Production. It stars characters from the game, and was used to promote new skins for the game. A dance video was also released. The official music video for "Pop/Stars" reached 30 million views on YouTube in five days, and 100 million in one month. On April 2, 2019, the music video reached 200 million views. As of April 21, 2025, the music video has 629 million views.

== Live performances ==
Soyeon, Miyeon, Madison Beer, and Jaira Burns performed the single at the 2018 League of Legends World Championship opening ceremony. The singers performed alongside augmented reality versions of the characters that they portrayed. During an online concert by (G)I-dle, the six members performed a cover of "Pop/Stars".

During their Just Me ( )I-dle World Tour, the remaining five members added the song to their regular setlist as well.

== Credits and personnel ==
- Vocals – Soyeon and Miyeon of (G)I-dle, Madison Beer and Jaira Burns
- Riot Music Team – production, composer, songwriting, vocal production, mix engineer, mastering engineer
- Sebastien Najand – composer, songwriting
- Justin Tranter - executive producer
- Harloe - songwriting, additional vocals
- Lydia Paek - Korean translation
- Minji Kim - Korean translation

== Charts ==
Chart performance for "Pop/Stars"
| Chart (2018) | Peak position |
|---|---|
| Australia Digital Tracks (ARIA) | 49 |
| Australia Hitseekers (ARIA) | 2 |
| Canadian Digital Song Sales (Billboard) | 30 |
| Czech Republic Singles Digital (ČNS IFPI) | 72 |
| France Downloads (SNEP) | 86 |
| Greece International Digital Singles (IFPI) | 29 |
| Hungary (Single Top 40) | 4 |
| Hungary (Stream Top 40) | 21 |
| Japan Hot Overseas (Billboard Japan) | 13 |
| Malaysia (RIM) | 16 |
| New Zealand Hot Singles (RMNZ) | 6 |
| Scottish Singles Sales (Official Charts) | 82 |
| Singapore (RIAS) | 6 |
| Slovakia Singles Digital (ČNS IFPI) | 91 |
| South Korea (Gaon) | 39 |
| Sweden Heatseeker (Sverigetopplistan) | 4 |
| UK Singles Downloads (Official Charts) | 75 |
| UK Independent (Official Charts) | 17 |
| US Digital Songs (Billboard) | 30 |
| US World Digital Song Sales (Billboard) | 1 |

== Certifications ==
| Region | Certification | Certified units/sales |
|---|---|---|
| New Zealand (RMNZ) | Gold | 15,000^{‡} |
| United States (RIAA) | Platinum | 1,000,000^{‡} |
^{‡} Sales+streaming figures based on certification alone.

== Release history ==
| Region | Release date | Format | Ref. |
|---|---|---|---|
| Various | November 3, 2018 | Digital download | |
