= Lexie Liu =

Chinese singer and rapper (born 1998)

- 刘柏辛
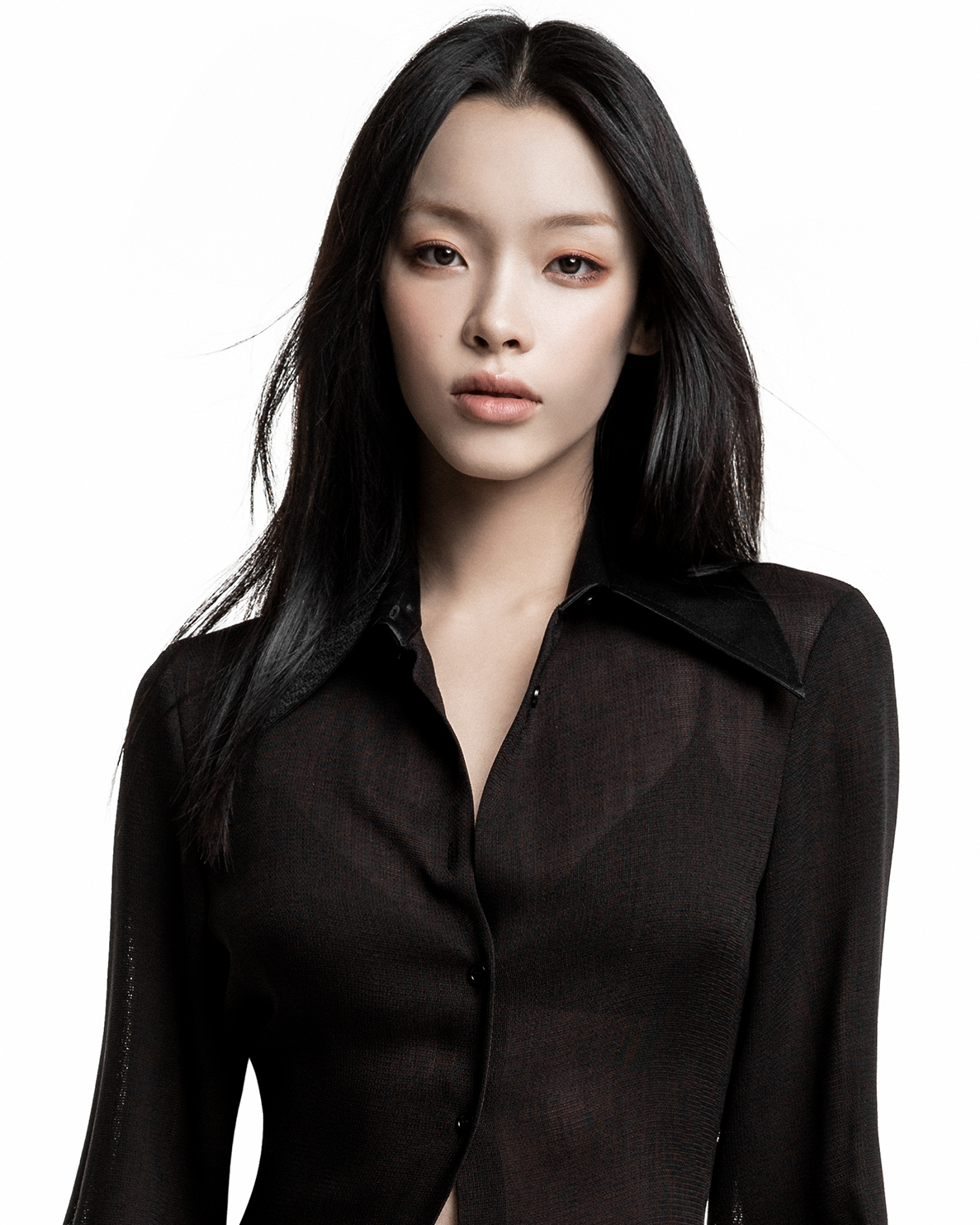
- Liu in 2020
- Born: Liu Yuyu (刘昱妤); December 21, 1998 (age 27); Changsha, Hunan, China
- Occupations: Singer, rapper, songwriter
- Years active: 2016–present

Chinese name
- Traditional Chinese: 劉柏辛
- Simplified Chinese: 刘柏辛
Transcriptions
Standard Mandarin
- Hanyu Pinyin: Liú Bóxīn

Alternative Chinese name
- Traditional Chinese: 劉昱妤
- Simplified Chinese: 刘昱妤
Transcriptions
Standard Mandarin
- Hanyu Pinyin: Liú Yùyú
- Musical career
- Genres: Mandopop, hip-hop, R&B
- Instruments: Vocals, piano

Lexie Liu, (/ˈlɛksiːljoʊ/, LEK-see LYOH) also known as Liu Boxin (Chinese: 刘柏辛; pinyin: Liú Bóxīn; born December 21, 1998), is a Chinese singer, rapper and songwriter. In 2015, she participated in K-pop Star 5, a South Korean reality TV competition series where her group came in fourth place. In July 2018, she participated in The Rap of China and finished fourth place, which launched her career as a solo artist. In February 2019, Liu released her debut EP 2030. She also featured as Seraphine in the K/DA song "More". She followed her debut EP with the album Meta Ego in 2019. In 2021, she released her EP Gone Gold, and in 2022, Liu released her album The Happy Star.

== Early life ==
Liu was born and raised in Changsha, Hunan. She has been interested in music since she was young; she started to dance when she was four years old and learned to play the piano when she was six years old. When Liu was in grade eleven, she transferred to an international high school. However, she took a gap year when she was in grade twelve to make music. She went to Korea and participated in the reality TV competition series, K-pop Star 5, under her birth name Liu Yuyu, as a member of a 4-person girl group named "Mazinga S" which won fourth place.

While shooting the TV show K-pop Star 5, Liu applied and was accepted to Fordham University to study global business. However, she later left to pursue her music career.

== Career ==
=== 2016–2021: Indie career, 2030, Meta Ego, and Gone Gold ===
In January 2017, Liu's first original single "Coco Made Me Do It" was released. In February 2017, she performed at the SXSW music festival, one of the largest music festivals in the world, bringing Chinese Pop music to the US audience.

In January 2018, she composed a song called "Role" for Li Yifeng, a Chinese popular idol, singer, and actor. In July 2018, Liu participated in The Rap of China, entered the final round with her song "Mulan," and eventually finished fourth place. While competing in The Rap of China, Liu signed with American label 88rising. In November, she released her new song "Sleep Away" from her upcoming debut EP 2030 which was previously released in China. The Fader named the track as one of “10 Songs You Need in Your Life,” Nylon listed it as the “Best Music Releases Of The Week," and Refinery29 said “their ears are very into Lexie.” On December 18, 2018, Liu released her new cyberpunk-influenced single "Nada," complete with futuristic-themed music video. The Line of Best Fit described "Nada" as it "sees Lexie Liu's fierce, cross-cultural grit thrust into a science fiction dimension where language barriers don't exist. She fuses Mandopop with grimy beats against the visuals of her accompanying Tron-esque video, directed by mamesjao, in a retro-futuristic digital world." "Nada" also made its appearance on "Best Of the Week" by Apple Music once it came out.

In February 2019, Liu released her debut EP 2030 in the United States, which included two new singles "Outta Time" featuring Killy and "Love and Run." In September 2019 her single "Ok, Ok, Ok" was released. On December 27, 2019, her album Meta Ego was released. On October 28, 2020, Liu voiced the champion Seraphine in Riot Games' virtual K-pop group, K/DA, in their new song "More" from their extended play All Out. Liu also performed on stage at the 2020 League of Legends World Championship in Shanghai.

On January 28, 2021, Liu released her second EP Gone Gold internationally (released as Online 上线了 in China), featuring her then-newest single "ALGTR" which was self-written and self-produced alongside the rest of the EP. It marked yet another change in sound direction, with the EP taking in significantly more electro-pop influences compared to previous efforts. The project's contemporary theme, reflected in the title track's music videos and the rest of the track list's visualizers which were directed by frequent collaborator Jeremy Z. Qin, revolves around the idea of living in an online game as a character. It was inspired by the unrest experienced throughout 2020 as a result of the worldwide COVID-19 pandemic, where Liu's only source of understanding the world was solely through a screen - leading her to imagine what life would be like without this source.

=== 2021–2024: The Happy Star ===
On November 21, 2022, Liu released a single by the name of "Fortuna" with an accompanying music video. "Fortuna" marks a slight change in Liu's style as a high-energy, electropop-inspired track making use of Mandarin, English, and Spanish in the lyrics. The song's lyrics and music video were heavily inspired by Egyptian mythology and tarot divination, having been named after the Roman goddess Fortuna, and making references to the Egyptian deities of Set and Anubis. On November 29, 2022, Liu followed up the release of "Fortuna" with a single entitled "Magician," with both songs having been inspired by the same theme of tarot divination. The lyrics make reference to the major arcana of the Magician, the Moon, the Sun, and the general suits of the Cups, the Wands, and the Pentacles found in tarot decks. The musical style of "Magician" is a further exploration of heavy electronic music and was performed in English and Mandarin.

On December 6, 2022, Liu released the full-length album The Happy Star. The album was composed of twelve tracks with “Fortuna" and "Magician" as singles.

On November 21, 2023, Liu released her single "delulu."

=== 2024–present: Teenage Ramble ===
On April 23, 2024, Liu was featured in the single, "On Clap," on Yuqi's EP Yuq1.

Singles "Pop Girl", released on March 18, 2025, and "FFFFF", released on May 28, 2025, were both featured on her second-full length album titled Teenage Ramble. The release of Teenage Ramble was announced on July 23, 2025 and single "Like U" was released on the same day. Teenage Ramble was released on October 16, 2025.

On February 26, 2026, Liu released a single, "Klepto", in collaboration with Sophie Powers.

Liu featured on the song "Break It" from Yves' April 2026 EP Nail and on the song "Porcelain" from Adam Lambert's July 2026 album Adam. Liu released remixes of "Pop Girl" featuring Bayli and Isabella Lovestory, and Yves in July 2026 on an EP titled Pop Girls Club.

== Public image ==
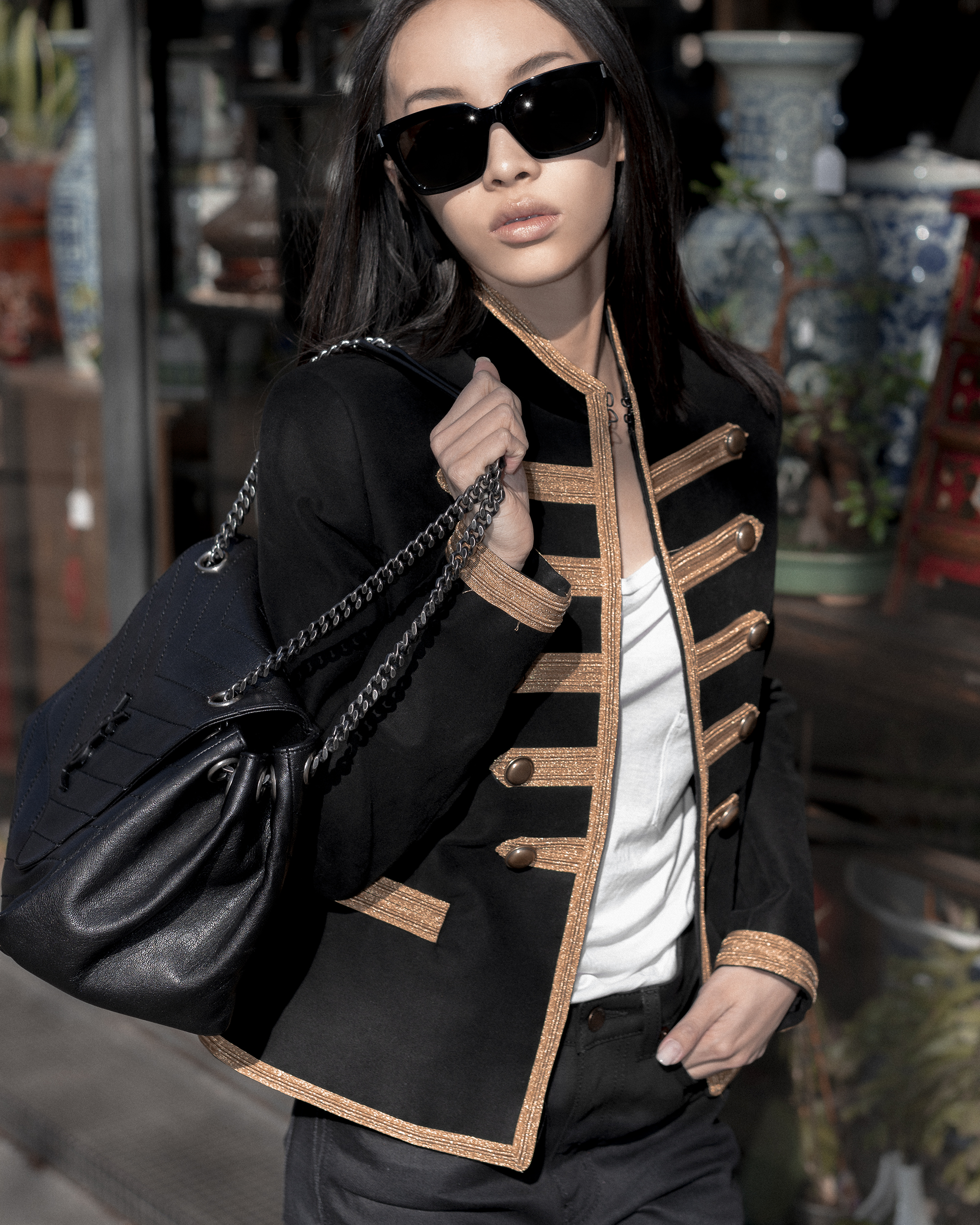
Liu in February 2019

Liu's appearance caught the attention of the fashion industry where she landed placements in Paris Fashion Week 2019 as the brand ambassador for Yves Saint Laurent eyewear in the Asia Pacific Region, Louis Vuitton Show 2018 in China, Puma's Suede 50 campaign, and Levi's New Years TVC campaign. Liu has also featured on the print pages of many fashion publications in East Asia, including Vogue Me (China), BAZAAR China, Nylon Japan, and Nylon China. The American fashion magazine V described her as "the face of a generation of new Chinese artists breaking into the American mainstream with a uniquely, cross-cultural sound."

"Born and raised in Changsha, China, 19-year-old Lexie Liu's 'Nada' is her third single release after signing to 88rising." "She became the youngest Chinese artist to ever perform at SXSW last year after rising to fame on South Korean TV show 'K-pop Star' and finishing fourth on the heavily male-dominated rap talent show 'The Rap of China.'"

After the release of her single "Like a Mercedes", the cyberpunk-inspired music video of the song was Lexie Liu's first introduction to a global audience, showing off how "her provocative sound is transcending language barriers." Her debut EP released in February 2019 was highly recommended, "with a feature from Killy on "Outta Time," plus new singles "Sleep Away," "Hat Trick" and "Nada," the eight-tracker is an impressive bilingual project showcasing the Changsha born and raised artist’s skills across rap, R&B vocals and production."

American fashion and culture magazine Flaunt praised Liu's debut EP 2030, which is said to "[narrate] her life and journey within music; manifesting her inner-psyche through dream-like vocals and vibrant musical films. Dynamic in all aspects, Lexie holds a promising trajectory in the years to come."

== Filmography ==
=== Variety shows ===
Year	English title	Original title	Network	Role	Notes
2015	K-pop Star 5	서바이벌 오디션 K팝 스타	SBS	Contestant	
2018	The Rap of China	中国新说唱	iQiyi	Contestant	Season 2 (2018)
2020	Singer 2020	歌手.當打之年	Hunan TV	Challenge Contestant	
2021	Stage Boom	爆裂舞台	iQiyi	Contestant	

== Discography ==
- 2030 (2018)
- Meta Ego (无限意识) (2019)
- The Happy Star (幸福星) (2022)
- Teenage Ramble (2025)

== Tours ==
- The Happy Star Company Tour (2024-2025)

City (2024)	City	Country	Venue
December 14	Nanjing	China	Unknown
December 21	Chengdu	China	Unknown
Date (2025)	City	Country	Venue
January 5	Shanghai	China	National Exhibition and Convention Center
January 19	Guangzhou	China	Unknown
May 10	Beijing	China	Unknown

== Collaboration with brands ==
- In January 2022, Lexie Liu became the new model of Ford EVOS.
- In October 2021, Liu became the brand ambassador for Miu Miu in the China region.
- In March 2019, Liu became the brand ambassador for Saint Laurent Eyewear in the Asia Pacific Region.
- In November 2018, Liu was invited as one of the celebrity guests to attend the Louis Vuitton show named "Volez Voguez Voyage."
- In December 2017, Liu participated in the shooting of Levis' New-Year TVC campaign called Gan Jiu Xing.She also appeared as the model in posters in local Levis stores across the globe.
- In October 2017, Liu collaborated with Puma and became a member of the Puma's Group, and attended Puma SUEDE, the Puma's 50th-anniversary party.

== Awards and nominations ==
Year	Nominated work	Event	Award	Result	Ref.
2019	2029	30th Golden Melody Awards	Best New Artist	Nominated	
2019	2029	3rd CMIC Music Awards	Newcomer of the Year	Won	
2020	"Manta"	The 7th Annual Fusion Hip-Hop Awards	Best Music Video	Won	
2021	"More"	Game Audio Network Guild Awards	Best Original Song	Won	
2021	"Manta"	28th ERC Chinese Top Ten Awards	Top Ten Hits	Won	
2023	The Happy Star	34th Golden Melody Awards	Best Mandarin Female Singer	Nominated	
2023	The Happy Star	1st Wave Music Awards	Best Female Vocalist	Nominated	
2023	The Happy Star	1st Wave Music Awards	Best Electronic Album	Won	
2023	The Happy Star	1st Wave Music Awards	Best Album Production	Nominated	
2023	The Happy Star	1st Wave Music Awards	Best Recording\Engineered Album	Nominated	
2023	"3.14159"	1st Wave Music Awards	Best Electronic Song	Won	
