= SXMPRA =

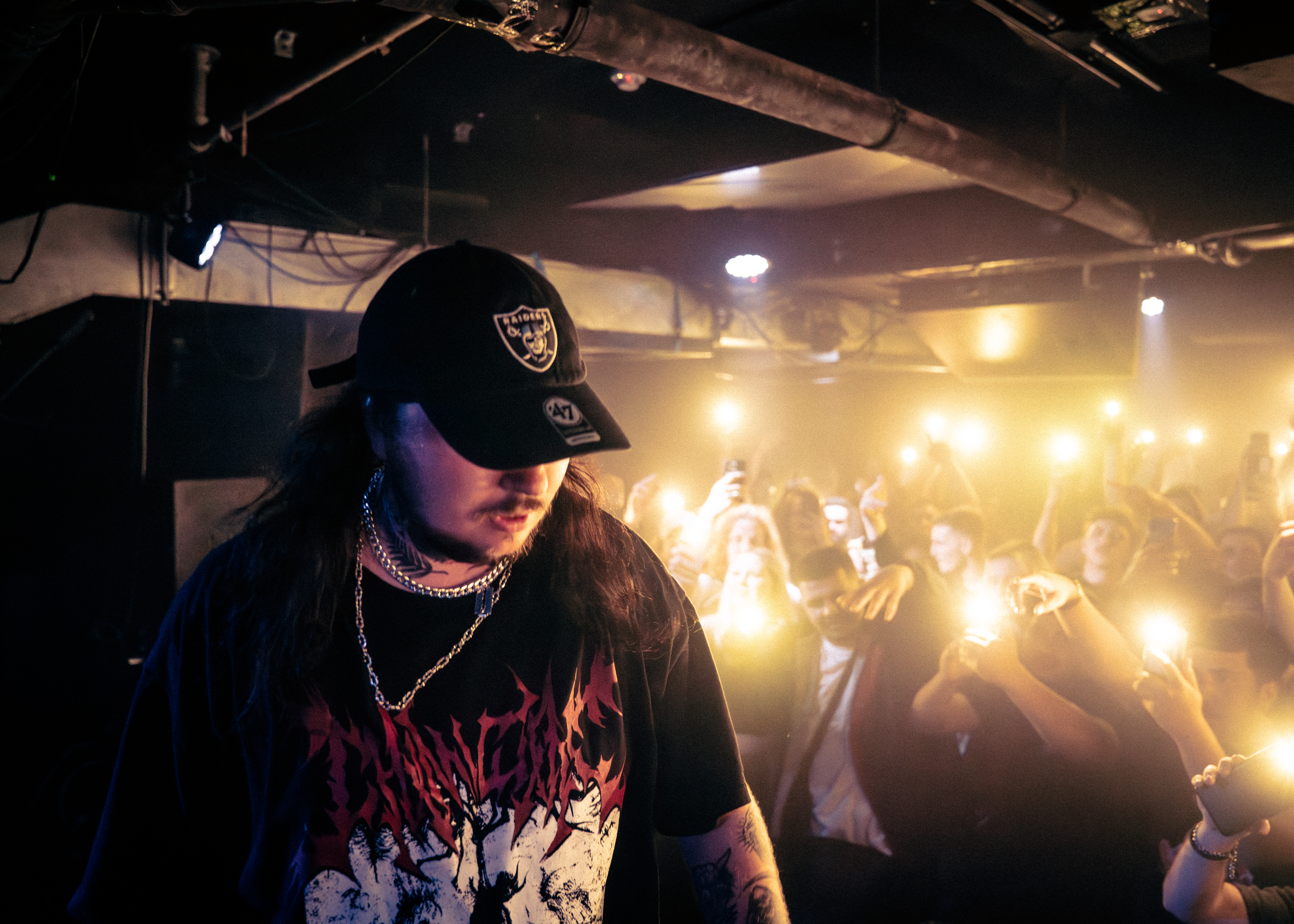
- SXMPRA performing in 2023

Background information
- Also known as: SXMPRA
- Born: Kalem Leo Tarrant; 8 February 2000 (age 26); Hamilton, New Zealand
- Origin: Wellington, New Zealand
- Genres: Hip hop, phonk, Trap metal,Memphis rap, experimental hip hop
- Occupations: rapper; record producer; songwriter
- Years active: 2018–present
- Label: 10K Projects

Kalem Leo Tarrant (born 8 February 2000), known professionally as SXMPRA (pronounced "Sempra") and formally as "Deatheater", is a songwriter, rapper and musician from Wellington, New Zealand. SXMPRA is known for his high energy and fast paced songs, with some of his most commercially successful being "Cowbell Warrior" and "Step Back!".

== Early life ==
Kalem Tarrant was born on 8 February 2000 in Hamilton, New Zealand. Tarrant's childhood was spent constantly moving between small-town New Zealand cities and Australia. Growing up, Tarrant was exposed to rock and metal introduced to him by his parents, and discovered Eminem at a young age. He later discovered then-underground rappers including Odd Future and Denzel Curry in his teens, before exploring pivotal 1990s acts such as Three 6 Mafia.

== Career ==
Beginning his journey on SoundCloud, SXMPRA began making music in 2018 using an Xbox headset to record songs onto free audio recording software Audacity on a MacBook he financed on a payment plan. Initially outsourcing production via "type beats" on YouTube, he describes his early music at the time as "an extension of the artists that I was listening to who weren't releasing enough music".

After releasing a consistent series of singles since 2018, in 2021, SXMPRA released his biggest track to date, "Cowbell Warrior", which saw US rapper Ski Mask The Slump God contribute to the official remix in 2023. Since signing with US label 10K Projects, Tarrant has also released collaborations with the likes of Juicy J, 1nonly, Terror Reid, Pouya and Jasiah.

In 2023, SXMPRA embarked on tours of the United States, Europe, Australia and New Zealand, including headline tours, a co-headline tour with fellow New Zealand artist lilbubblegum, and a tour supporting US artist HAARPER, as well as festival appearances in the United States and New Zealand.

Tarrant's stage name, SXMPRA, references the Harry Potter spell "sectumsempra". "Sectum" being a Latin verb translating as "severed", while "sempra" is derived from the Latin word "semper," which means "continuously" to suggest "severed continuously".

== Musical style ==
Tarrant counts artists including XXXtentacion, $UICIDEBOY$, Ghostemane and Pouya as integral acts who have shaped the sound he's been refining since 2018; intertwining the energetic expression of both his respective backgrounds in rap and rock to create a crossover of sinister trap metal, gritty horrorcore, and distorted phonk music.

== Discography ==
=== Extended plays ===
Year	Title	Release date
2021	Vendetta	19 February 2021
2021	The Art of Human Nature	25 August 2021
2023	The Evil In Which We Thrive (w/ Dozy Doe)	3 February 2023
2024	Untamed (w/ Jasiah)	23 February 2024
