= Legends of Runeterra =

Digital collectible card game

- Developer: Riot Games
- Publisher: Riot Games
- Directors: Andrew Yip; Dave Guskin
- Producers: Jeff Jew; Dave Guskin
- Series: League Of Legends
- Engine: Unity
- Platforms: Microsoft Windows; Android; iOS
- Release: April 29, 2020
- Genre: Digital collectible card game
- Modes: Single-player, multiplayer

Legends of Runeterra (LoR) is a 2020 digital collectible card game developed and published by Riot Games. Inspired by the physical collectible card game Magic: The Gathering, the developers sought to create a game within the same genre that significantly lowered the barrier to entry. Since its release in April 2020, the game has been free-to-play, and is monetised through purchasable cosmetics. The game is available for Microsoft Windows and mobile operating systems iOS and Android.

Like other collectible card games, players play one versus one to reduce their opponent's health to zero. Cards come in a variety of types and belong to one of ten regions—groups of cards with a similar gameplay identity. One significant feature is the game's combat pacing; unlike in other collectible card games, each player alternates between attacking and defending every turn.

Many characters from League of Legends, a multiplayer online battle arena by Riot Games, feature in the game. The fictional universe of Runeterra, released by the developer through short stories, comic books, and an animated series, provides flavor and theming for the game's cards.

Legends of Runeterra has been well received by critics, who point to its generous progression systems, accessible gameplay, and high-quality visuals, and has won several industry awards.

== Gameplay ==
Legends of Runeterra is a digital collectible card game played one versus one. At the beginning, both players' Nexus has 20 health points; the first to fall to zero loses. Players begin each match with a hand of four cards, which they may trade away for another random card from their deck. Each round, both players draw one card. Cards are played by spending mana; players begin with zero mana, and gain one additional mana crystal per round up to a maximum of ten. A maximum of three unspent mana is stored automatically at the end of a round as spell mana; this can be used in future rounds to cast spells but cannot summon unit cards.

One of the game's distinguishing features is its combat pacing. Each round, the "attack token", a symbol which indicates which player may attack and who will defend, alternates from player to player. This is reflected visually on each players' half of the board, with a sword icon representing attack or a shield for defense. Some cards enable players to attack when they do not have the attack token.

=== Cards ===
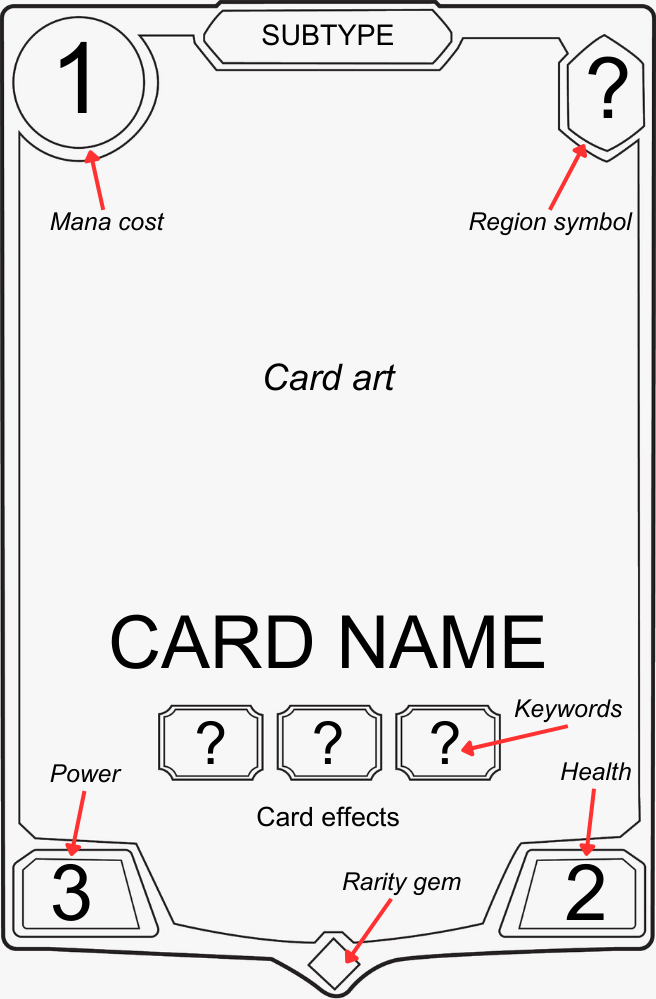
Dissection of a Legends of Runeterra unit card

Each card in the game belongs to a region; in standard play, one deck can use cards from up to two regions. Regions have a distinct style of play and identity. Unlike other trading card games, there are no neutral cards that can be used in every deck. The regions originated in the wider League of Legends expanded universe. Upon the game's initial release, there were three types of card: champions, followers, and spells. Champion cards are the playable characters from League of Legends. These cards are unique within the game because they can level up. Levelling a champion transforms the card—and all copies of it in the player's deck—into a more powerful version of the card. Unit cards, which includes champions and non-champions (followers), have a number representing their attack and health statistic; attack is how much damage a unit deals to either the Nexus or its blocker, while health reflects the maximum damage a card can take before being removed from play.

Spell cards have a "speed", denoting when they can be played and in what way the opponent is able to respond, if at all. At launch, there were three speeds: slow, fast, and burst. Slow-speed spells cannot be played during active combat, (Note: Combat means when an attack has been declared by one player.) pass priority over to the opponent, and can be responded to with fast or burst spells; fast spells can be played during combat and do not pass priority; and burst speed spells resolve their effect instantly with no opportunity for opponent response. A fourth speed, Focus, resolves immediately and does not pass over turn priority, but can only be used outside of combat. Unit cards do not have a speed, but end a player's turn within a round.

Another card type was added in the Monuments of Power expansion—landmarks. Landmarks are played with regular unit mana and consume a position on the player's board; they cannot block or attack. Some landmarks have a "countdown" mechanic, wherein they cause a set effect after a certain number of rounds.

== Development and release ==
Riot Games employees have considered making a card game since early in the company's history. The company has a significant number of fans of the collectible card game genre. Legends of Runeterra's balancing director, Steve Rubin, pointed to Jeff Jew, the game's executive producer and an early Riot Games employee, and Andrew Yip, as big fans of Magic: The Gathering. There were several different concepts of the game, but Legends of Runeterra was primarily developed over three years beginning in 2017. Riot recruited professional Magic competitors as early playtesters; of them, Steve Rubin was invited to return permanently and later moved into the design team. Rubin noted that the announcement of Artifact caused the developers to consider rushing the game's release, but ultimately decided to polish the game and aim for wider demographics.

A significant challenge in development was determining the mechanics of card acquisition; an early iteration in which players simply unlocked region combinations was poorly received by playtesters, who missed the satisfaction of collecting all cards. Accessibility was a priority for the developers, who sought to provide a familiar experience while not forcing players to buy booster packs, a random bundle of cards otherwise common in the CCG genre. The developers placed a limit on how many cards could be bought in exchange for real money each week. Instead, players are given a number of random cards each week that scales with how frequently they play, and a mechanic called Wild Cards, a way for players to directly craft desired cards. Jeff Jew said that frictionless card collection for players enables the developers to balance more responsively, as players would not be upset that a deck they spent up to US$100 building had been weakened.

In 2023, an update introducing an Emporium, in which cards and cosmetic items could be purchased with real currency, was released. The Emporium was criticized for its pricing and bugs, with director Dave Guskin acknowledging the issues. The Emporium allowed for the purchase of chests containing a random assortment of cards, which was perceived as contradictory to the original statement of not purchasing booster packs. Card acquisition was also changed, reducing the number of Wild Cards which could be acquired for free. This was later stated to be an oversight in which intended behavior was misidentified as a bug.

=== Release and sets ===
Legends of Runeterra was revealed at Riot Games' celebration event of the tenth anniversary of League of Legends on October 15, 2019; applications for the closed beta period began following the conclusion of the stream. Eurogamer observed the unusual timing of the reveal, given the recent failure of Valve's Artifact and the waning audience for Blizzard Entertainment's Hearthstone. The first closed beta period ended in October 2019. A second provided access to an additional mode called Expeditions from November 14–19, 2019. The open beta, giving access to all players, commenced on January 24, 2020; unlike in the closed beta period, cards and cosmetics purchased in the open beta carried over to the live release of the game.

The game was released on April 29, 2020; although the beta period was limited to Windows users, the launch accompanied the game's release on mobile operating systems iOS and Android. During beta, the game had included six regions, with four champion cards per region, and 294 total cards. The official launch also brought a new set to the game, Rising Tides, introducing 120 new cards and a new region—Bilgewater. Along with new cards, sets contain new game mechanics and further development to existing ones. Every existing region was given an additional champion, with Bilgewater having six.

With the game's second set, Call of the Mountain, Riot Games altered the release schedule, with each set spanning three "expansions". Call of the Mountain introduced the region of Mount Targon and was released for PC and mobile devices on August 26, 2020. The region of Shurima became part of the game with the Empires of the Ascended set, released on March 3, 2021. The tenth and final region of the game, Bandle City, was released on August 25, 2021, and brought four expansions instead of the usual three. Between the region expansions are Event or Champion Expansions, with Aphelios for the Call of the Mountain set, Viego & Akshan for the Empires of the Ascended set, and Path of Champions for the Beyond the Bandlewood, all of which belongs to the Event Set. After the final region, Bandle City, fully released in 2022, Legends of Runeterra started releasing stand-alone expansions, with content for both PvP and PvE aspects of the game. The first stand-alone expansion, Worldwalker, was released on May 25, 2022, introducing Runeterran champions.

In January 2024, Riot Games downsized the development team for Legends of Runeterra as part of a company-wide layoff affecting 530 employees. The decision was attributed to the game's underperformance. Following the changes, the team shifted their focus from PvP to the PvE game mode Path of Champions.

Set	Expansion	Release date	Notes
Foundations	-	January 23, 2020	In-game since Beta. Official release on the game release date.
Rising Tides	-	April 28, 2020	Introduces Bilgewater. Released on the game release date.
Call of the Mountain	Call of the Mountain	August 26, 2020	Introduces Targon. Expansion has the same name as the Set.
Call of the Mountain	Monuments of Power	October 14, 2020	Introduces Landmarks.
Call of the Mountain	K/DA ALL OUT	October 28, 2020	First event set. Introduces 5 cards themed around virtual Riot Games pop group K/DA.
Call of the Mountain	Cosmic Creation	December 16, 2020	
Call of the Mountain	Aphelios	February 3, 2021	First Champion Expansion. Part of the event set.
Empires of the Ascended	Empires of the Ascended	March 3, 2021	Introduces Shurima. Expansion has the same name as the set.
Empires of the Ascended	Guardians of the Ancient	May 5, 2021	
Empires of the Ascended	Rise of the Underworlds	June, 30th 2021	
Empires of the Ascended	Sentinels of Light/Akshan & Viego	July 14, 2021	Second Champion Expansion. Part of the event set.
Beyond the Bandlewood	Beyond the Bandlewood	August 25, 2021	Introduces Bandle City. Expansion has the same name as the set.
Beyond the Bandlewood	The Path of Champions	November 10, 2021	Champion expansion introducing Jayce, along with a new game mode.
Beyond the Bandlewood	Magic Misadventures	December 8, 2021	
Beyond the Bandlewood	A Curious Journey	February 15, 2022	
Worldwalker		May 22, 2022	Introduces Runeterran champions.
Forces from Beyond		July 20, 2022	Introduces Kai'sa, Gwen, and Evelynn.
The Darkin Saga	Awakening	August 31, 2022	Introduces equipment.
The Darkin Saga	Domination	October 12, 2022	
The Darkin Saga	World Ender	December 7, 2022	Introduces Ryze.
Glory in Navori		March 29, 2023	Introduces rotation, removing many cards, including champions, from Standard play.
Heart of the Huntress		June 21, 2023	Introduces Nidalee, Neeko, and The Poro King.
Fate's Voyage	Onward	September 12, 2023	First expansion of Set 8. According to internal set IDs, Set 7 has not been completed.
Fate's Voyage	Beyond	December 6, 2023	
Dreamlit Paths		April 24, 2024	

== Reception ==
Reception

Aggregate scores
Aggregator	Score
Metacritic	87/100
OpenCritic	100% recommend

Review scores
Publication	Score
GameSpot	9/10
IGN	9/10
PC Gamer (US)	85/100

Legends of Runeterra received positive reviews from critics. According to review aggregator Metacritic, the game has a weighted average of 87/100. Fellow review aggregator OpenCritic assessed that the game received "mighty" approval, being recommended by 100% of critics.

Many outlets highlighted that the game was both accessible for newcomers to the genre while preserving its depth. IGN's Cam Shea awarded the game a 9/10, noting that it managed to maintain its complexity while also streamlining elements from other collectible card games, such as Magic: The Gathering. Jason Coles of NME wrote that it "may well be the most accessible card game out there".

Also of note was the game's generous free-to-play business model, especially in relation to other games in the same genre. Giving the game an 85/100, Steven Messner, writing for PC Gamer noted the absence of "booster packs", bundles of cards purchasable with real currency, having been replaced with a generous battle pass system which gives out an abundance of free cards and crafting material every week. Messner also mentioned the ease of achieving the maximum level of the battle pass every week.

=== Awards ===
Legends of Runeterra was nominated for Best Mobile Game at The Game Awards 2020. Apple named it the iPad Game of the Year for 2020. It was also awarded with Mobile Game of the Year by the Academy of Interactive Arts & Sciences at the 24th Annual D.I.C.E. Awards.
