= Seraphine (League of Legends) =

League of Legends character

- Seraphine from League of Legends
- First game: League of Legends
- Designed by: Bethany Higa (writer); Anna Nikonova (concept art)
- Voiced by: Jasmine Clarke

Seraphine is a character introduced in 2020 for Riot Games' video game League of Legends. She was promoted through a fictional virtual influencer persona on Instagram and Twitter, depicting her as an aspiring musician who would collaborate with the fictional pop group K/DA. This social media persona belongs to an alternate fictional universe, separate from Seraphine's original characterisation within the game's Runeterra setting. These social media accounts posted from her perspective, showing her day-to-day life and music, including comments about collaborating with fictional band K/DA. The character is also depicted posting about her self-doubt and asking for support from fans. The posts were written by Brittany Higa, who was involved in the creation of the character and stated that she used her own personal experiences of self-doubt in writing her. She is voiced by Jasmine Clarke.

She has received generally negative reception for multiple factors, and was identified as the most controversial character in League of Legends by PCGamesN writer Lauren Bergin. The social media content was criticized as promoting parasocial relationships and using mental health for marketing, particularly during the COVID-19 pandemic. Riot responded to the criticism, stating that they would be mindful of fan engagement in the future. She was accused by an employee of Riot of having her likeness taken for this character, which Riot denies.

== Appearances ==
Seraphine was first introduced as a virtual influencer on multiple social media accounts, such as Instagram and Twitter in 2020. The accounts had photos and music framed as being by her, including content tying into the fictional band K/DA. The account also depicted Seraphine expressing her anxieties as well as worries about not being good enough to collaborate with K/DA, asking fans to send her supportive messages that were later shown on a corkboard. Fans of League of Legends eventually realized that she was connected to the series, and Riot Games came out to confirm their involvement in September 2020. She was officially revealed as a playable character in an official blog post to be released on October 28, 2020. The accounts were active from June 26, 2020 to November 8, 2020.

In League of Legends, Seraphine is a singer from the fictional region of Piltover whose magical ability allows her to perceive other people's emotions as music. As her powers intensified, the constant sounds of those around her became overwhelming, leading her parents to create a device using Hextech, a form of magical technology, to dampen them. In her original backstory, the device contained a stolen crystal associated with the Brackern, a race of scorpion-like creatures whose souls were trapped within Hextech crystals. Seraphine discovered that she could hear the Brackern through the crystal and developed a connection with one particular soul, whose song helped her learn to manage her abilities.

In Riot Games' original explanation of the character, narrative writer Rayla "Jellbug" Heide described empathy as central to Seraphine's design, with her supernatural hearing allowing her to experience others' emotions through music. Narrative writer Daniel "Istogaiden" Couts explained that song was important to the Brackern and that Seraphine could hear the songs continuing from their crystals. Riot's developers described her as hearing the emotions of Piltover and Zaun's inhabitants alongside those of trapped souls, and stated that her inability to rescue the latter did not mean she was indifferent to their suffering. Her motivation was to connect with and uplift others through music, transforming the emotions she perceived into songs she could share with those around her. Couts further explained that she could hear an individual's soul-song and sing it back to them.

The original story nevertheless attracted criticism over Seraphine's use of Brackern-powered Hextech, which some fans considered inconsistent with her intended empathy. On October 28, 2020, Riot Games co-founder Marc Merrill responded to criticism of the character's lore by stating that the disputed material was supposed to have been removed and would be fixed. On October 29, senior game designer Jeevun "Jag" Sidhu explained that although players knew Hextech crystals originated from the Brackern, Seraphine had not discovered the origin of the entity with which she had connected. Sidhu stated that she would try to give the Brackern a voice if she learned of their circumstances, and addressed a controversial in-game taunt directed at Skarner as dialogue intended for players rather than an accurate reflection of Seraphine's knowledge.

== Concept and creation ==
Seraphine was conceived as a music-themed character, with the branded social media account created to help people "get to know Seraphine and watch her journey from bedroom artist to pop star". The concept was that she would become more confident and eventually collaborate with K/DA. She was written by Bethany Higa, who assisted in multiple other areas of her design, including visual design and creative direction. According to Higa, she was also responsible for adding the narrative into the character's marketing strategy and leading a "Chinese-American diaspora focus group" as part of designing her cultural background. Higa, who was responsible for writing posts as Seraphine, stated that she used her own experiences of self-doubt, particularly as a Riot Games employee right out of college, in writing the posts, and that the intention behind her story on social media was to "show that sense of hope, that sense of persistence, and show her growing in confidence and overcoming those struggles and those fears that she might have". Seraphine is voiced by Jasmine Clarke, who also did her musical performance in the track "Against All Odds".

Riot Games separately documented the development of Seraphine's Runeterra character in an October 12, 2020 article. Narrative writer Rayla "Jellbug" Heide explained that the team wanted to explore the creative and positive aspects of Piltover and Zaun through a singer, while concept artist Anna "Newmilky" Nikonova described the challenge of making a pop star feel native to the game's fictional setting. The team used the region's Hextech technology to explain her microphone and performances, and developed her floating stage partly to distinguish her silhouette from other playable characters.

Her gameplay was also designed around cooperation. Senior game designer Jeevun "Jag" Sidhu explained that he wanted Seraphine's abilities to encourage players to work together and enjoy playing as a team. Her supportive abilities and music-related mechanics were developed to reward coordination between allies. The development team also described her as a character motivated by affection for others, with Nikonova stating that Seraphine wanted everyone to know that she loved them.

== Reception ==
Reception for Seraphine has generally been negative, with PCGamesN writer Lauren Bergin describing her as the game's most controversial character. Following the release of her gameplay spotlight video, it was reportedly the most disliked video for a League of Legends character. The English video received a majority of dislikes to likes on YouTube, while the Korean version had a significantly higher dislike-to-like ratio. Contemporary reporting attributed the negative reception to several factors, including criticism that her K/DA marketing had been prioritised over her in-game identity, objections to her technology and visual design, perceived gameplay similarities to fellow League of Legends character Sona, and controversy surrounding her use of Brackern-powered Hextech. Dot Esports described the latter criticism in terms of her "uncharacteristically cruel lore relating to Brackerns". While Seraphine was initially at the top of tier lists in terms of her strength as a character, various modifications to balance her gameplay resulted in her being among the worst characters in the game. Character producer Lexi Gao stated that updates were tools that allowed them to revisit what worked and what didn't. An attempt by Riot Games to rework Seraphine to have a different gameplay type was controversial, leading to the Twitter hashtag #RevertSeraphine.

Bergin stated that she was initially not interested in playing as her due to visuals, which she felt were terrible. She was particularly critical of certain design aspects, such as her "weird, clunky stage". Commenting on the controversial changes, Bergin stated that she liked many of the changes made, but was sad that Seraphine plays differently now. She stated that most fun parts of playing the game have involved her. She found herself playing the character less, stating that her role as a support seems confusingly implemented, and hoped that forthcoming changes to her gameplay would improve her play.

== Controversies ==
=== Accusations of unethical marketing ===
The depiction of Seraphine on the branded Twitter account was the subject of controversy. In the replies asking for support, many users expressed anger over these kinds of posts, with multiple users expressing disapproval for the idea of using mental health as part of marketing. Users who replied with messages of support for Seraphine were consistently told that she was not real. She was also compared to virtual influencer Miquela Sousa due to both "creating relationships with others, all while not being real". Riot Games creative director Patrick Morales responded to the criticism, stating that he was proud of Bethany Higa's work on the character, but felt that there were unintended consequences. He stated that, in the future, the team will be more mindful of the use of topics that "may potentially hurt or mislead people" and how the character "engages her followers".

Vice writer Gita Jackson claimed that Riot was attempting to create parasocial relationships between fans and the character similar to that of real pop stars. Jackson compared this campaign to Barbie vlogs, stating that while these vlogs "do a great job of using her relatability and aspirational nature to create a space of safety", Seraphine's posts are an "emotional feedback loop directing you to more Seraphine content". Jackson criticised the campaign as "beyond perverse" and offensive, arguing that Seraphine's fictional social media persona was disconnected from the political and social circumstances of the real world during the COVID-19 pandemic. Jackson also argued that an alternate version of the character benefiting from genocide made it feel "bizarre" to see this character being marketed like this. Polygon writer Julia Lee stated that she is not real, criticizing the account for encouraging users to feel a connection with her through the use of mental illness due to this account being a "social marketing campaign for a video game character". She considered Seraphine a "startling reminder that brands and the characters used to promote them are not our friends". Fanbyte writer Natalie Flores was also critical of how Seraphine was branded, calling it "gross" and accusing the marketing team of creating parasocial relationships between the Seraphine Twitter account and fans. Flores believed that part of the appeal of having a parasocial relationship with a character like Seraphine was that it did not need to extend beyond supportive messages due to the relationship not being real.

The campaign being done during the COVID-19 pandemic was the subject of criticism. Both Lee and Flores noted it in their discussion of the campaign, with Lee stating that it was especially upsetting to see mental health used during the pandemic as marketing. Flores felt that the use of mental health in marketing a character like this was noxious during a pandemic, stating that seeing her thanking users for their supportive messages, especially right after a therapy appointment, made her feel "physically sick". Jackson also was critical, stating that her post about quitting her job "hits different during a pandemic where over seven million people have lost their jobs".

=== Likeness theft accusation ===
A former Riot Games employee, Stephanie, accused Riot Games, particularly a fellow employee whom she dated, of having used her appearance and life as the basis for Seraphine's design without her consent. This allegation was denied by Riot Games, which claimed that the character was not based on anyone and that the employee she accused had left the studio and had never had creative input. She alleged that the employee gave her a drawing of the character Ahri designed to resemble her. She also alleged that the employee told her that he had influence over K/DA and to keep an eye out for a K/DA-related surprise on her birthday. When her birthday arrived in 2019, an illustration of Seraphine was posted on the character's account to state that she would be collaborating with K/DA. She stated that she shared photos of her with her cats and an essay she wrote about regions Seraphine was from with this employee, claiming that appear to have been used as inspiration. She stated that the similarities felt gross to her and that the similarities have been pointed out to her by strangers. Janelle Wavell-Jimenez, a former product manager and in-game cosmetics producer, expressed skepticism that a character or skin would be based on a "random Rioter's love interest and use that as a basis for a million dollar business decision".

PC Gamer writer Tyler Wilde stated that another employee also had a "credible claim" to inspiring the character, with one designer, Jeevun Sidhu, stating that his partner, a fellow Riot Games employee, was the inspiration for her personality. On this, Stephanie clarified she did not believe Seraphine was exclusively based on her, and argued that Sidhu's claim would contradict Riot's claim that she was not based on anyone. Wilde believed that the design was genuinely similar to Stephanie, citing their face shape, glasses, hair, and similar name. TheGamer writer Peter Glagowski believed that her claims seem to have merit, suggesting that at most, Riot did not intend it but that "her presence contributed to the design of Seraphine" at some point. He also believed that Sidhu's claim contradicted Riot Games', and that previous accusations of Riot Games stealing people's likenesses suggested there was merit to her claims. Fellow TheGamer writer Bella Blondeau agreed, finding the evidence compelling and also calling out previous accusations. She felt that, when compounded with other controversies, such as the genocide aspect of her character and the Twitter account, it would be best to retire the character.
