= I-dle videography =

South Korean videography

I-dle video discography
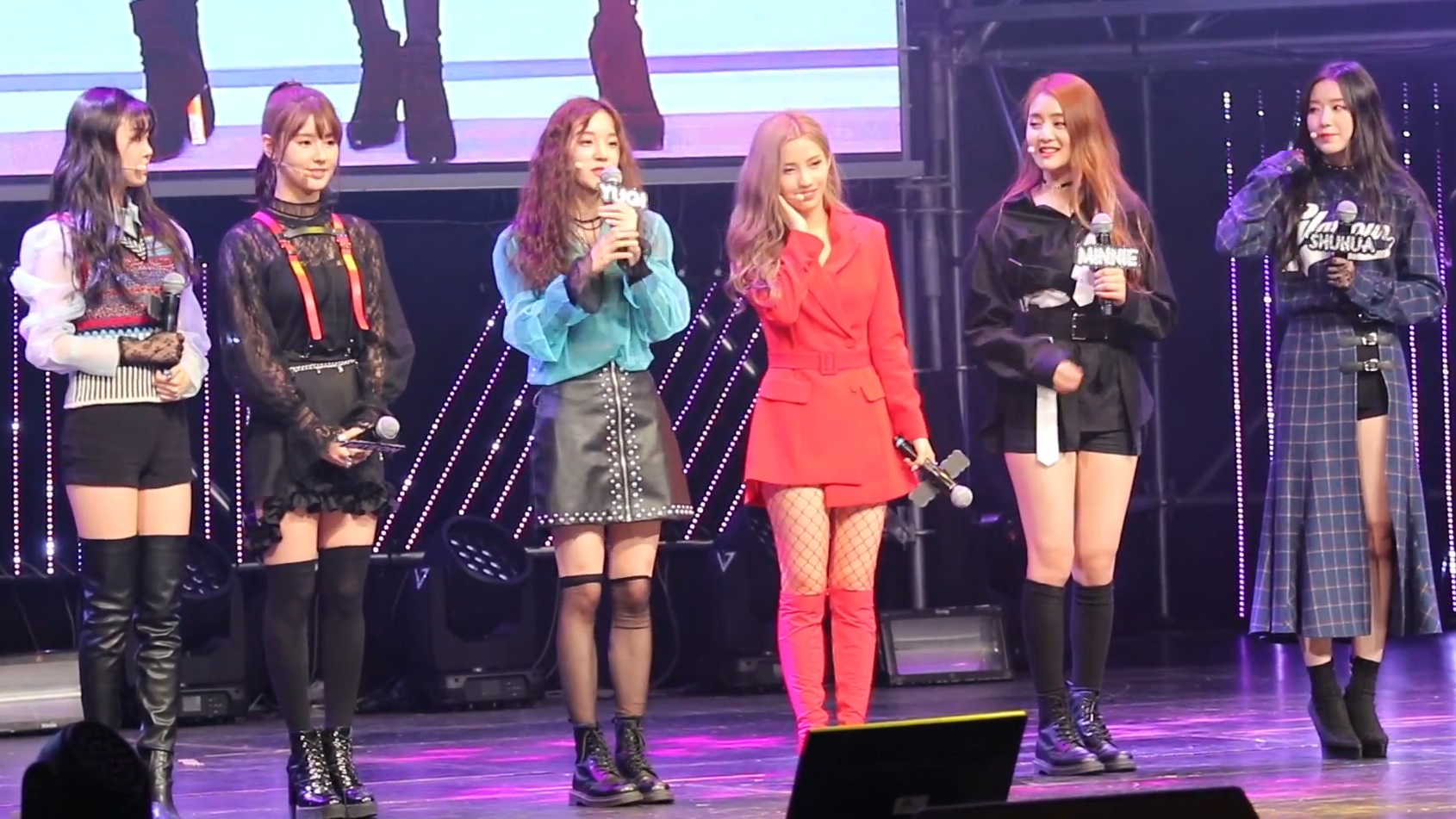
- (G)I-dle at I Am debut showcase on May 2, 2018.
- Music videos: 29
- Lyric videos: 9
- Music clips: 4
- Live clips: 6
- Dance practice videos: 15

This is the list of South Korean girl group I-dle videography. It includes music videos, lyric videos, dance practice videos, music clips and commercial films since its debut as (G)I-dle in 2018.

== Music videos ==
=== Korean ===
Year	Published	Title	Other versions	Album/Single	Director(s)	Length	Ref.
2018	May 2	"Latata"		I Am	Zanybros	3:41	
2018	August 14	"Hann (Alone)"		Digital single	Zanybros	3:44	
2019	February 19	"Blow Your Mind"		I Made	(G)I-dle	2:55	
2019	February 26	"Senorita"		I Made	Zanybros	3:44	
2019	June 26; July 29	"Uh-Oh"	(NY Edition)	Digital single	Digipedi; Studio Choom	3:31; 3:32	
2019	November 3	"Lion"	Performance ver.	I Trust	Digipedi	3:37	
2020	April 6	"Oh My God"		I Trust	Yoon Rima, Jang Dongju (Rigend Film Studio)	3:20	
2020	July 7	"I'm the Trend"		Dumdi Dumdi	Unknown	3:27	
2020	August 3 August 4	"Dumdi Dumdi"	Performance ver.	Dumdi Dumdi	Jang Jaehyeok, Lee Kyeongsoon (Bibbidi Bobbidi Boo.); Novvkim	5:12	
2021	January 11	"Hwaa"		I Burn	Paranoid Paradigm (VM Project Architecture)	3:18	
2021	February 5	"Hwaa (Dimitri Vegas & Like Mike remix)"		Digital single	Unknown	2:56	
2021	April 29	"Last Dance"		Digital single	Illumin	3:26	
2022	March 14	"Tomboy"	Zanmang Loopy ver.	I Never Die	Son Seung-hee (HighQualityFish)	3:18	
2022	October 17	"Nxde"		I Love	Son Seung-hee (HighQualityFish)	3:03	
2023	May 10	"Allergy"	Special Performance ver.	I Feel	Son Seung-hee (HighQualityFish)	3:00	
2023	May 15	"Queencard"	Performance ver.	I Feel	Son Seung-hee (HighQualityFish)	3:30	
2024	January 22	"Wife"		2	Yongsoo Kim (HighQualityFish)	2:16	
2024	January 29	"Super Lady"	Special Performance ver.	2	Son Seung-hee (HighQualityFish)	2:40	
2024	February 16	"Revenge"		2	Hobin	3:18	
2024	July 8	"Klaxon"		I Sway	Yvng Wing (Aedia Studios)	3:06	
2025	May 9	"Girlfriend"		We Are	Kim In-tae (AFF)	2:44	
2025	May 19	"Good Thing"		We Are	Ha Jung-hoon (Hattrick)	2:55	
2026	June 14	"Crow"		We Made	1andon Visual	3:22	
2026	July 6	"Gimme Dat Love"		We Made	Lafic	2:46	

=== Japanese ===
Year	Published	Title	Other versions	Album/Single	Director(s)	Length	Ref.
2019	July 11	"Latata" (Japanese ver.)	Crush Diamond Eyes ver.	Latata	Jimmy (VIA); Zanybros	3:13; 3:36	
2020	August 19	"Oh My God" (Japanese ver.)		Oh My God	Zanybros	3:29	
2025	October 3	"Where Do We Go" (どうしよっかな)		I-dle	Hideto Hotta	3:50	

=== English ===
Year	Published	Title	Other versions	Album/Single	Director(s)	Length	Ref.
2023	July 14	"I Do"		Heat	Hanbago (STBY)	5:15	
2023	October 6	"I Want That"		Heat	Lee Hangyeol (Hanbago)	3:33	
2026	January 27	"Mono" (featuring Skaiwater)		Digital single	Cho Joonkoo (Aimus)	3:00	

== Lyric videos ==
Year	Published	Title	Ref.
2020	April 8	"Oh My God"	
2020	April 9	"Luv U"	
2020	April 17	"Oh my god (English Ver.)"	
2020	May 20	"Latata (English Ver.)"	
2020	July 7	"I'm the Trend"	
2020	July 29	"Oh my god (Japanese Ver.)"	
2020	August 7	"Dumdi Dumdi"	
2021	January 18	"Hwaa"	
2021	January 27	"Hwaa (English Ver.)"	

== Music clips ==
Year	Published	Title	Length	Ref.
2020	April 16	"Oh My God"	3:25	
2020	August 7	"Dumdi Dumdi"	3:32	
2021	January 14	"Hwaa"	3:23	
2022	November 5	"Love"	3:23	

== Live clips ==
Year	Published	Title	Length	Ref.
2022	April 7	"Never Stop Me" (말리지 마)	2:27	
2022	November 10	"Change"	3:31	
2023	May 29	"Allergy"	2:43	
2024	March 13	"Fate" (나는 아픈 건 딱 질색이니까)	2:53	
2024	July 29	"Last Forever"	2:29	
2026	February 11	"Mono" (featuring Skaiwater)	2:49	

== Other videos ==
Year	Published	Title	Note(s)	Ref.
2018	April 25	(G)I-dle - My name is Soyeon	Debut introduction videos	
2018	April 25	(G)I-dle - My name is Soojin	Debut introduction videos	
2018	April 25	(G)I-dle - My name is Shuhua	Debut introduction videos	
2018	April 26	(G)I-dle - My name is Yuqi	Debut introduction videos	
2018	April 26	(G)I-dle - My name is Minnie	Debut introduction videos	
2018	April 26	(G)I-dle - My name is Miyeon	Debut introduction videos	
2018	May 3	Latata @ Debut Showcase	Debut Showcase	
2018	August 11	(G)I-dle - Flashmob in New York	(G)I-dle in NY x flash mob	
2019	February 28	Made by Soyeon	Behind the scene of making I Made	
2019	June 8	The loveless	Drawing video	
2019	September 28	(G)I-dle's Album Making Behind The Scene : Manager [VR 180]	A 360-degree video, presented by LG Corporation, produced by Ventavr	
2019	December 27	(여자)아이들(G)I-dle) - Visual Film	Directed by Jang Jaehyeok (Bibbidi Bobbidi Boo.)	
2021	January 11	화(火花)(HWAA) : Online Media Showcase Ver.	I Burn online showcase	
2021	February 6	HWAA(火/花) (Chinese Ver.) 녹음 비하인드	Behind the scene of making "Hwaa (火/花)" (Chinese Ver.)	
2021	April 23	Prologue: The Witch Queen	Directed by Illumin	
2022	February 25	(여자)아이들((G)I-dle) Comeback Trailer: [I Never Die]	I Never Die trailer	
2022	March 8	(여자)아이들((G)I-dle) - 'My Bag' Track Video	"My Bag" track video	
2022	October 11	(여자)아이들 ((G)I-dle) - X-File Video VIDEO	"Dark (X-File) video	
2022	October 13	(G)I-dle - 5th Mini Album "I love" Interview	I Love interview video	
2023	May 13	(여자) 아이들((G)I-DLE) - Comeback Interview : [I feel]	I Feel interview video	

== Dance practice videos ==
Year	Published	Title	Choreographer(s)	Length	Ref.
2018	May 10	"Latata"	Star System	3:25	
2018	August 20	"Hann (Alone)"	Star System	3:33	
2019	March 4	"Senorita"	Star System	3:22	
2019	June 30	"Uh-Oh"	Star System	3:20	
2019	October 29	"Put It Straight (Nightmare ver.)"	Star System	3:46	
2019	November 27	"Lion"	Kim Sehwan & Hyunjin (Star System)	3:33	
2020	April 12	"Oh My God"	Kim Sehwan & Hyunjin (Star System)	3:24	
2020	April 20	"Oh My God (Special Choreography Video)"	Kim Sehwan & Hyunjin (Star System)	3:28	
2020	August 10	"Dumdi Dumdi"	Leejung Lee	3:33	
2021	January 19	"Hwaa"	Kim Sehwan & Hyunjin (Star System)	3:22	
2022	March 24	"Tomboy"	Kim Sehwan & Hyunjin (Star System); Kiel Tutin	2:58	
2022	March 28	"My Bag"	Kim Sehwan & Hyunjin (Star System)	2:47	
2022	October 23	"Nxde"	Moon Tae-eun; Kiel Tutin	3:01	
2023	May 21	"Queencard"	Tae-eun; ShaSha	2:43	
2024	July 13	"Klaxon"	Kim Sehwan & Hyunjin (Star System); Kiel Tutin	2:54	

== Commercial films ==
Year	Company Name	Product Name	Kinds	Length	Note(s)	Ref.
2017	Rising Star Cosmetics	Water bangbang ample mist	Cosmetics	0:44	Directed by VISUAL4113	
2019	LG Corporation Korea	LG U+ 5G	Network service			
2020	Akiii Classic	AKIIIClassic X (G)I-dle 2020 S/S	Clothing	1:49	Lookbook	
2020	Akiii Classic	AKIIIClassic X (G)I-dle 2020 Summer	Clothing	1:12	Lookbook brand film	
2020	Akiii Classic	AKIIIClassic X (G)I-dle 2020 S/S	Clothing	0:28	Lookbook brand film ver.2	
2020	Akiii Classic	Sandal Vegas	Shoes	0:39		
2020	Akiii Classic	Sandal Cruise	Shoes	0:21		
2020	Akiii Classic	Sandal Athen	Shoes	0:21		
2020	Akiii Classic	Sandal Bogota	Shoes	0:25		
2020	Akiii Classic	Sandal Quick-Slide	Shoes	0:31		
2020	Akiii Classic	Rash guard	Rash guard	0:31		
2020	Akiii Classic	AKIIIClassic X (G)I-dle This fall and winter are color.	Clothing	1:36		
2020	Akiii Classic	Padding	Padding	0:40		
2020	Akiii Classic	AKIIIClassic X (G)I-dle2020 F/W season	Clothing	0:40	Lookbook	

== Others ==
=== Photo albums ===
List of photo albums with selected details
Title	Information	Details of contents
2020 (G)I-dle Online Concert 'I-Land: Who Am I'	Released: November 15, 2020; Label: Cube Entertainment; Photos taken during I-Land: Who Am I concert	1. Photobook (176 pages)

=== Calendars ===
List of calendars with selected details
Title	Information	Details of contents
(G)I-dle 2019 Season's Greetings	Released: December 17, 2018; Label: Cube Entertainment	1. Calendar
(G)I-dle 2020 Season's Greetings	Released: December 31, 2019; Label: Cube Entertainment	1. Desk Calendar; 2. Post it 3. Photo Card Set (12pcs); 4. Accordion Calendar
(G)I-dle 2021 Season's Greetings	Released: December 29, 2020; Label: Cube Entertainment	1. Package; 2. Desk calendar (32p) + memo pad (60 sheets); 3. Diary; 4. Mini poster calendar 5. Photo cardset (6 each 1 set); 6. Greeting card set (6 each 1 set); 7. Photo stand
(G)I-dle 2023 Season's Greetings [Blooming Day]	Released: December 27, 2022; Label: Cube Entertainment	1. Package; 2. Desk calendar (26p); 3. Diary (100p); 4. Photo cardset (5 each 1 set); 5. Stamp set 6. Paper sachet 7. Masking tape (2 each); 8. Message card 9. Paper frame 10. Photo calendar (12 each 1 set); 11. Poloroid (pre-order only)
