= List of songs recorded by I-dle =

Songs recorded by (G)I-dle

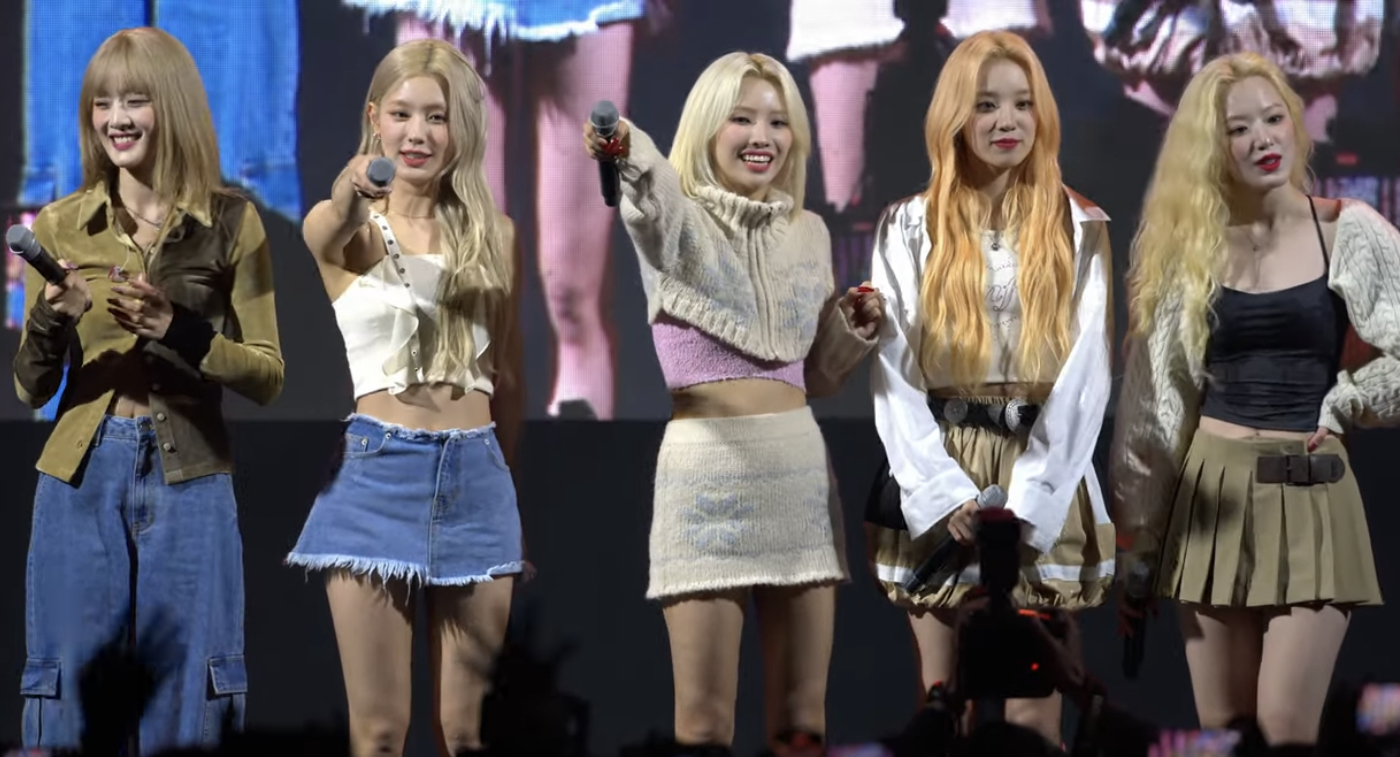
(G)I-dle in 2022

Here is a complete list of songs by the South Korean girl group I-dle.

Key
†	Indicates single release
‡	Song available in Korean and Japanese
#	Indicates song or single not written by anyone from (G)I-dle

== 0-9 ==
Song	Writer			Album/Single	Year	Language	Ref.
Song	Lyrics	Composition	Arrangement	Album/Single	Year	Language	Ref.
"$$$" (달라; Dalla (Dollar))	Soyeon; Le`mon	Soyeon; Big Sancho		I Am	2018	Korean	
"7 Days"	Minnie; Tim Tan	Minnie; BreadBeat	BreadBeat	2	2024	English	

== A ==
Song	Writer			Album/Single	Year	Language	Ref.
Song	Lyrics	Composition	Arrangement	Album/Single	Year	Language	Ref.
"Already"	Minnie; Houdini; Soyeon	Minnie; Houdini		I Never Die	2022	Korean	
"Allergy"	Soyeon	Soyeon; PopTime; Daily; Likey		I Feel	2023	Korean	
"All Night"	YuqiWooseok	Yuqi; Siixk Jun	Siixk Jun	I Feel	2023	Korean	

== B ==
Song	Writer			Album/Single	Year	Language	Ref.
Song	Lyrics	Composition	Arrangement	Album/Single	Year	Language	Ref.
"Blow Your Mind"	Minnie; FlowBlow; Soyeon	Minnie; FlowBlow		I Made	2019	Korean	
“Bloom"	Minnie; B.O.	Minnie; BreadBeat; Cashcow	BreadBeat; Cashcow	I Sway	2024	Korean	

== C ==
Song	Writer			Album/Single	Year	Language	Ref.
Song	Lyrics	Composition	Arrangement	Album/Single	Year	Language	Ref.
"Change"	Minnie; Soyeon	Minnie; BreadBeat	BreadBeat	I Love	2022	Korean	
“Chain"	Minnie; Tim Tan	Minnie; BreadBeat; CashCow; B.O.	BreadBeat; CashCow	We Are	2025	Korean	

== D ==
Song	Writer			Album/Single	Year	Language	Ref.
Song	Lyrics	Composition	Arrangement	Album/Single	Year	Language	Ref.
"Don't Text Me"	Big Sancho; Park Hae-il; Jerry Potter; Soyeon	Big Sancho; Park Hae-il; Jerry Potter	Big Sancho; Park Hae-il	I Am	2018	Korean	
"Dumdi Dumdi" ^{†‡}	Soyeon	Soyeon; Pop Time		Dumdi Dumdi	2020	Korean	
"Dumdi Dumdi" ^{†‡}	Soyeon; Yuqi; Z King	Soyeon; Pop Time		Dumdi Dumdi	2020	Chinese	
"Dumdi Dumdi" ^{†‡}	Soyeon; Ji Yong Park	Soyeon; Pop Time		Oh My God	2020	Japanese	
"Dahlia"	Minnie; BreadBeat; Soyeon	BreadBeat; Minnie	BreadBeat	I Burn	2021	Korean	
"Dark (X-File)"	Soyeon Yuqi	Yuqi; Siixk Jun	Siixk Jun	I Love	2022	Korean	
"Doll"	Yuqi; Boytoy; Jayins; Mojo	Yuqi; Boytoy; Mojo; Jayins; Lee Seung-hoon (Plz)	Lee Seung-hoon (Plz)	2	2024	Korean	

== E ==
Song	Writer			Album/Single	Year	Language	Ref.
Song	Lyrics	Composition	Arrangement	Album/Single	Year	Language	Ref.
"Escape"	Minnie; BreadBeat; Soyeon	Minnie; BreadBeat	BreadBeat	I Never Die	2022	Korean	
"Eyes Roll"	Meghan Trainor; KNY Factory; Ryan Trainor; Soke; J.Lauryn; Park Young Bin		Banx & Ranx; Chasu	Heat	2023	English	

== F ==
Song	Writer			Album/Single	Year	Language	Ref.
Song	Lyrics	Composition	Arrangement	Album/Single	Year	Language	Ref.
"For You"	Minnie; FCMHoudini; Soyeon; Eri Osanai (Japanese Lyrics)	Minnie; FCMHoudini		Latata	2019	Japanese	
"Flip it"	Evan Gartner; Blaise Railey; GiGi Grombacher; J.Lauryn; Lucas Macaluso; 8AE		Evan Gartner; Lou Caluso	Heat	2023	English	
"Fate" (나는 아픈 건 딱 질색이니까) ^{‡}	Soyeon	Soyeon; Pop Time; Daily; Likey		2	2024	Korean	
"Fate" (나는 아픈 건 딱 질색이니까) ^{‡}	Soyeon; Kanata Okajima (Japanese Lyrics)	Soyeon; Pop Time; Daily; Likey		I-dle	2025	Japanese	
"Farewell to the World" (愛せなかった世界へ永遠にじゃあね)	Kanata Okajima; Soyeon	Soyeon; Daily	Lee Beom-Hun (Prismfilter)	I-dle	2025	Japanese	

== G ==
Song	Writer			Album/Single	Year	Language	Ref.
Song	Lyrics	Composition	Arrangement	Album/Single	Year	Language	Ref.
"Give Me Your" (주세요)	Soyeon		Soyeon; HouDini	I Made	2019	Korean	
“Girlfriend"^{†}	Soyeon	Soyeon; Pop Time; Daily; Likey		We Are	2025	Korean	
“Good Thing"^{†}	Soyeon	Soyeon; Pop Time; Daily; Likey		We Are	2025	Korean	

== H ==
Song	Writer			Album/Single	Year	Language	Ref.
Song	Lyrics	Composition	Arrangement	Album/Single	Year	Language	Ref.
"Hear Me" (들어줘요; Deuleojwoyo)	Son Young-jin; Noh Kyung-min	Son Young-jin		I Am	2018	Korean	
"Hann (Alone)" ^{†‡}	Soyeon	Soyeon; Yummy Tone		Non-album single	2018	Korean	
"Hann (Alone)" ^{†‡}	Soyeon	Soyeon; Yummy Tone		Latata	2019	Japanese	
"Hwaa" ((화(火花)); Anger(Spark)) ^{†}	Soyeon	Soyeon; Pop Time		I Burn	2021	Korean	
"Hann (Alone in winter)" (한(寒); Han(Cold))	Soyeon; Ahn Ye-eun		BreadBeat; Ahn Ye-eun; Soyeon	I Burn	2021	Korean	
"Hwaa (English Ver.)"	Soyeon; Phildel (English lyrics)	Soyeon; Pop Time	Pop Time; Soyeon	Non-album single	2021	English	
"Hwaa (火/花)" (Chinese Ver.)	Soyeon; Yuqi (Chinese lyrics)	Soyeon; Pop Time	Pop Time; Soyeon	Non-album single	2021	Chinese	
"Hwaa (Dimitri Vegas & Like Mike Remix)"	Soyeon	Soyeon; Pop Time	Dimitri Vegas & Like Mike	Non-album single	2021	English, Korean	

== I ==
Song	Writer			Album/Single	Year	Language	Ref.
Song	Lyrics	Composition	Arrangement	Album/Single	Year	Language	Ref.
"I'm the Trend" ^{†}	Minnie Yuqi; Soyeon; FCM Houdini	FCM Houdini; Minnie; Yuqi; Yuto	Yuto; FCM Houdini	Dumdi Dumdi	2020	Korean	
"I Do" ^{†}	Imad Royal; Rogét Chahayed; Blaise Railey; Drew Love		Rogét Chahayed; Imad Royal	Heat	2023	English	
"I Want That" ^{†}	Ryan Tedder; Michel "Lindgren" Schulz; Melanie Fontana; Madison Love		Lindgren	Heat	2023	English	
"If You Want" (그래도 돼요)	Shuhua	Yu Song-yeon; Kang Hyun-jin	Yu Song-yeon; Kang Hyun-jin	We Are	2025	Korean	
"Invincible"	Hayato Yamamoto; Jamil Kazmi; Kona Rose Jackson	Hayato Yamamoto; Jamil Kazmi; Kona Rose Jackson; Soma Genda	Hayato Yamamoto; Soma Genda	I-dle	2025	Japanese	

== K ==
Song	Writer			Album/Single	Year	Language	Ref.
Song	Lyrics	Composition	Arrangement	Album/Single	Year	Language	Ref.
"Klaxon" (클락션)^{†}	Soyeon	Soyeon; Pop Time; Daily; Likey		I Sway	2024	Korean	

== L ==
Song	Writer			Album/Single	Year	Language	Ref.
Song	Lyrics	Composition	Arrangement	Album/Single	Year	Language	Ref.
"Latata" ^{†‡}	Soyeon	Soyeon; Big Sancho		I Am	2018	Korean	
"Latata" ^{†‡}	Soyeon; Yu Shimoji (Japanese lyrics)	Soyeon; Big Sancho		Latata	2019	Japanese	
"Latata" ^{†‡}	Soyeon; Lauren Kaori (English lyrics)	Soyeon; Big Sancho		Non-album single	2020	English	
"Light My Fire"	Yu Shimoji	Hjalmar Wilen; Malin Johansson; Birk Storm	Hjalmar Wilen	Latata	2019	Japanese	
"Lion" ^{†‡}	Soyeon	Soyeon; Big Sancho (Yummy Tone)		Queendom Final Comeback	2019	Korean	
"Lion" ^{†‡}	Soyeon	Soyeon; Big Sancho (Yummy Tone)		I Trust	2020	Korean	
"Luv U" (사랑해)	Soyeon	Soyeon; Big Sancho (Yummy Tone)		I Trust	2020	Korean	
"Lost"	Yuqi; Seo Jae-woo; Soyeon	Seo Jae-woo; Yuqi	Seo Jae-woo	I Burn	2021	Korean	
"Last Dance" (Note: Recorded for the global K-pop entertainment platform, Universe.)	Kriz; Soyeon	GroovyRoom; Soyeon	GroovyRoom	Non-album single	2021	Korean	
"Liar"	Yuqi; Siixk Jun; Soyeon	Yuqi; Siixk Jun; Kim Myong-kyu	Siixk Jun; Kim Myong-kyu	I Never Die	2022	Korean	
"Love"	Soyeon	Soyeon; Big Sancho		I Love	2022	Korean	
"Lucid"	Minnie; Soyeon	Minnie; BreadBeat; Sinkung	BreadBeat; Sinkung	I Feel	2023	Korean	
"Last Forever"	Yuqi; Boytoy; Mojo; Ssuvy; Heggy (Plz)	Yuqi; Boytoy; Mojo; Milli Oshyun; Ssuvy; Heggy (Plz); Jiwoong (Plz)	Boytoy; MojoMilli; Oshyun; Jiwoong (Plz)	I Sway	2024	Korean	
“Love Tease"	Yuqi; Taneisha Jackson; Chelsea Warner; Charlotte Wilson; Isa Guerra	Yuqi; Siixk Jun; Taneisha Jackson; Chelsea Warner; Charlotte Wilson; Ciara Muscat	Siixk Jun	We Are	2025	Korean	

== M ==
Song	Writer			Album/Single	Year	Language	Ref.
Song	Lyrics	Composition	Arrangement	Album/Single	Year	Language	Ref.
"Maze"^{‡}	Son Young-jin; Ferdy; Soyeon	Son Young-jin; Ferdy		I Am	2018	Korean	
"Maze"^{‡}	Samuelle Soung	Son Young-jin; Ferdy		Latata	2019	Japanese	
"Maybe"	Soyeon	Soyeon; Min Lee "collapsedone"	Min Lee "collapsedone"	I Trust	2020	Korean	
"Moon"	Soyeon	Minnie; FCM Houdini; FCM 667		I Burn	2021	Korean	
"My Bag"	Soyeon	Soyeon; Nathan	Nathan; Flip_00	I Never Die	2022	Korean	
"Mono (feat. skaiwater)" ^{†}	icebluerabbit* Shannon Bae skaiwater	icebluerabbit* Daily; Shannon Bae; Kameron Glasper; Likey	Daily; Likey	Non-album single	2026	English	

== N ==
Song	Writer			Album/Single	Year	Language	Ref.
Song	Lyrics	Composition	Arrangement	Album/Single	Year	Language	Ref.
"Never Stop Me" (말리지 마)	Soyeon	Soyeon; Kako; Pop Time	Kako; Pop Time	I Never Die	2022	Korean	
"Nxde"^{†}	Soyeon	Soyeon; Kako; Pop Time	Soyeon; Kako; Pop Time	I Love	2022	Korean	
"Nxde (Steve Aoki Remix)"	Soyeon	Soyeon; Kako; Pop Time	Steve Aoki	Non-album single	2022	Korean	
“Neverland"	Miyeon; Yuqi	Yuqi; Siixk Jun; Wooseok	Siixk Jun	I Sway	2024	Korean	

== O ==
Song	Writer			Album/Single	Year	Language	Ref.
Song	Lyrics	Composition	Arrangement	Album/Single	Year	Language	Ref.
"Oh My God" ^{†‡}	Soyeon	Soyeon; Big Sancho		I Trust	2020	Korean	
"Oh My God" ^{†‡}	Soyeon; Lauren Kaori	Soyeon; Big Sancho		I Trust	2020	English	
"Oh My God" ^{†‡}	Soyeon; So Yeon Jeon; Tae Ho Kim	Soyeon; Big Sancho		Oh My God	2020	Japanese	

== P ==
Song	Writer			Album/Single	Year	Language	Ref.
Song	Lyrics	Composition	Arrangement	Album/Single	Year	Language	Ref.
"Put It Straight" (싫다고 말해)	Soyeon		Soyeon; HouDini	I Made	2019	Korean	
"Put It Straight" (Nightmare Version)	Soyeon		June (쥰); Soyeon	Fan-dora's Box Part 1	2019	Korean	
"Polaroid"	Yuqi; Boytoy (Blatinum); PLZ (Blatinum)			I Never Die	2022	Korean	
"Paradise"	Minnie; B.O; Soyeon	Minnie; BreadBeat	BreadBeat	I Feel	2023	Korean	
"Peter Pan" (어린 어른)	Yuqi Soyeon	Yuqi; Siixk; Jun Wooseok	Siixk Jun	I Feel	2023	Korean	

== Q ==
Song	Writer			Album/Single	Year	Language	Ref.
Song	Lyrics	Composition	Arrangement	Album/Single	Year	Language	Ref.
"Queencard" ^{†‡}	Soyeon	Soyeon; PopTime; Daily; Likely		I Feel	2023	Korean	
"Queencard" ^{†‡}	Soyeon; Maena Sugimoto (Japanese Lyrics)	Soyeon; Pop Time; Daily; Likey	Pop Time; Daily; Likey; Soyeon	I-dle	2025	Japanese	

== R ==
Song	Writer			Album/Single	Year	Language	Ref.
Song	Lyrics	Composition	Arrangement	Album/Single	Year	Language	Ref.
"Reset"	Soyeon	Yuqi; Boytoy (Blatinum); Disko (Blatinum); PLZ (Blatinum)	Yuqi; Boytoy (Blatinum); Disko (Blatinum)	I Love	2022	Korean	
"Revenge"	Soyeon	Soyeon; Pop Time; Kako		2	2024	Korean	
"Rollie"	Yuqi; Boytoy; Melli (Plz); 213 (Plz); Mojo	Yuqi; Boytoy; Melli (Plz); 213 (Plz); Mojo; Milli Oshyun	213 (Plz); Mojo; Milli Oshyun; Boytoy	2	2024	English	

== S ==
Song	Writer			Album/Single	Year	Language	Ref.
Song	Lyrics	Composition	Arrangement	Album/Single	Year	Language	Ref.
"Senorita" ^{†‡}	Soyeon		Soyeon; Big Sancho	I Made	2019	Korean	
"Senorita" ^{†‡}	Soyeon; Tae Ho Kim	Soyeon	Soyeon; Big Sancho	Oh My God	2020	Japanese	
"Sculpture"	Soyeon; Minnie; Houdini	Minnie; Houdini	Houdini; Lo (Raw)	I Love	2022	Korean	
"Super Lady" ^{†}	Soyeon	Soyeon; Pop Time; Daily; Likey		2	2024	Korean	

== T ==
Song	Writer			Album/Single	Year	Language	Ref.
Song	Lyrics	Composition	Arrangement	Album/Single	Year	Language	Ref.
"Tung-Tung (Empty)"	Minnie; FCM Houdini; Soyeon; Mio Jorakuji	Minnie; Houdini		Oh My God	2020	Japanese	
"Tomboy" ^{†}	Soyeon	Soyeon; Pop Time; Jenci		I Never Die	2022	Korean	
"Tomboy (R3hab Remix)"	Soyeon	Soyeon; Pop Time; Jenci	R3hab	Non-album single	2022	Korean	
"Tall Trees"	Jon Bellion; Johnny Simpson; Scotty Dittrich			Heat	2023	English	

== U ==
Song	Writer			Album/Single	Year	Language	Ref.
Song	Lyrics	Composition	Arrangement	Album/Single	Year	Language	Ref.
"Uh-Oh" ^{†‡}	Soyeon	Soyeon; June; MooF (153/Joombas)	June; MooF (153/Joombas)	Non-album single	2019	Korean	
"Uh-Oh" ^{†‡}	Soyeon; Jun Sik Seo; Sun Ae Na; Ye Won Moon	Soyeon; June; MooF (153/Joombas)	June; MooF (153/Joombas)	Oh My God	2020	Japanese	
“Unstoppable"	Miyeon	Miyeon; Mingtion; Anne Judith; Wik; Dana	Mingtion	We Are	2025	Korean	

== V ==
Song	Writer			Album/Single	Year	Language	Ref.
Song	Lyrics	Composition	Arrangement	Album/Single	Year	Language	Ref.
"Villain Dies"	Soyeon	Soyeon; The Proof	The Proof	I Never Die	2022	Korean	
"Vision"	Miyeon; Minnie; Rodyo	Minnie; BreadBeat; Shin Kung	BreadBeat; Shin Kung	2	2024	Korean	

== W ==
Song	Writer			Album/Single	Year	Language	Ref.
Song	Lyrics	Composition	Arrangement	Album/Single	Year	Language	Ref.
"What's in Your House?" (알고 싶어; Algo Shipeo)	Arin; Vincenzo; Fuxxy; Any Masingga; Soyeon	Arin; Vincenzo; Fuxxy; Any Masingga	Vincenzo; Any Masingga	I Am	2018	Korean	
"What's Your Name"	Soyeon	Soyeon; Min Lee "collapsedone"	Min Lee "collapsedone"	I Made	2019	Korean	
"Where Is Love"	Soyeon	Soyeon; Min Lee "collapsedone"	Min Lee "collapsedone"	I Burn	2021	Korean	
"Wife" ^{†}	Soyeon	Soyeon; Daily; Likey; Pop Time		2	2024	Korean	
"Where Do We Go" (どうしよっかな) ^{†}	Soyeon; Futoshi; Jamil Kazmi	Daily; Haju; Pop Time; Soyeon		I-dle	2025	Japanese	

== Other songs ==
Song	Year	Artist(s)	Album/Single	Ref.
Upgrade	2018	All	ONE	
"Follow Your Dreams" (한걸음)	2018	All	ONE	
"Young & One"	2018	All	ONE	
"Mermaid" with Lee Min-hyuk, Peniel, Jung Il-hoon, Jang Ye-eun, and Wooseok	2018	Soyeon	ONE	
"Pop/Stars" with Madison Beer and Jaira Burns as K/DA	2018	Soyeon, Miyeon	Non-album single	
"Run! (Relay)"	2018	All	Running Man: Pululu's Counterattack OST	
"Relay : Remixes"	2019	All	Digital single	
"Help Me"	2019	All	Her Private Life OST (Part 1)	
"Sad Dream" (비몽)	2019	All	Immortal Songs: Singing the Legend - Let's Dance Time Koyote	
"Show"	2020	All	Two Yoo Project Sugar Man - Back in the Days Special	
"The Baddest" with Bea Miller and Wolftyla as K/DA	2020	Soyeon, Miyeon	All Out	
"More" with Madison Beer, Jaira Burns, Lexie Liu and Seraphine as K/DA	2020	Soyeon, Miyeon	All Out	

== Notes ==
icebluerabbit is a pseudonym used by Soyeon
