= I-Land: Who Am I =

(G)I-dle pay-per-view and livestreaming concert

- Online concert by (G)I-dle
- Venue: Cube TV website
- Start date: July 5, 2020
- Duration: 2 hours
- Attendance: 11,000
- Website: Official website

(G)I-dle concert chronology
- (G)I-dle Online Concert "I-Land: Who Am I" (2020); (G)I-dle World Tour "Just Me ( )I-dle" (2022)

I-Land: Who Am I, also known as the 2020 (G)I-dle Online Concert 'I-Land: Who Am I', is the first online live concert by South Korean girl group (G)I-dle. The live concert was broadcast live on Cube TV website, at 3pm KST on July 5, 2020. Initially, it was planned to conduct the first world tour in 32 cities around the world, but the offline performance was canceled due to COVID-19 pandemic, and an online paid concert was held.

“A space where dreams become reality" is a description by Cube Entertainment about the group's first solo concert. The concert introduced 6 individual and 1 group multi-view cameras. Over 11,000 paid real-time viewers watched the concert with an admission fee of 39,000 won ($33). As a multilingual group, (G)I-dle communicated with fans using Korean, Chinese, Japanese, Thai, and English.

== Background and contents ==
On January 22, (G)I-dle released a poster on their social media accounts announcing the world tour. On January 28, (G)I-dle revealed the locations and dates for their tour and is set to begin on April 4, 2020 in Bangkok, Thailand. Later, it was announced their stop in Bangkok was postponed amid the COVID-19 pandemic. However, the entire tour scheduled to take place in 32 global cities from April was cancelled after the announcement of I-Land: Who Am I online concert.

On July 3, Cube Entertainment unveiled the setlist spoiler image two days before their first solo concert.

On July 5, 2020, (G)I-dle showed 22 stages, performing all their title tracks, Pop/Star, "$$$", "Maybe", "What's your name" and solo and unit stages. In the concert, "Maybe" which was unveiled at this concert as "Online first, first in Korea, first in the world, and first in space", showed dancers using a tool reminiscent of a lightsaber. Miyeon, Minnie and Yuqi performed "Kiss It Better", which was sung during their weekly trainee evaluations.

Stage
The group perform on a stage before a "screen background", using all three sides of the walls on the stage as well as the floor — giving the entire space an almost wondrous look when the camera shot from a bird's-eye view down on the stage. During the performance for "Put It Straight", dramatic red lighting were used to amplify a horror-like mood throughout and finished off with the members sitting in the middle of a raining background.

Transmission errors
The performance went smoothly for about 110 minutes, the screen and the sound started to distort at 4:51 KST. The screen came back after 2 minutes, but the image quality was not improved. It did suffer a 25-minute-long glitch near the end. The members advised the viewers to press refresh, and the screen returned to normal at around 4:57 KST, but the screen was unstable until the last stage, causing viewer inconvenience. The problem received mixed reception. Some fans who watched the concert posted a photo with a review that could not recognize the member's face due to a transmission error. Some fans gave up after several buffering and delays. Some fans expressed their opinions such as "Aware of the system error and waited until it was okay", and there were fans who were satisfied with the online concert. It happened after group member Cho Miyeon was jokingly twerking during their first encore, "Uh-Oh" stage which they filmed with their own camera, and there was a joke among fans that "The server broke because of 'Chowerking'". 'Chowerking (조월킹)' is the combination of Miyeon's surname 'Cho (조)' and 'twerking (트월킹)'.

== Receptions ==
Lee Eunho from Kukinews stated in his review that he is impressed with the members' personal stage that showed their confidence as "our strength is personality".

RPM9 reporter Park Dong-seon wrote, "6 people 6 colours (G)I-dle synergy...Minnie's emotional vocals with the combination of classical guitar in "Why Do You Love Me" (original song Charlotte Lawrence), Yuqi's heavy vocal in "What About Us" (original song P!nk) and Miyeon's fresh power vocal charm in "What Now" (original song Rihanna). The stage of three vocal members showed the strength of the tone combination in unit stage "Kiss it better". In addition, Soyeon presented her unique intense rapping in "Hey Mama" (original song David Geta and Nicki Minaj), Soojin's dreamy yet sexy charm in dance cover "Trampoline" (original song Shaed) and Shuhua's beautiful performance in "Majestic Scene"."

Yoon So-yeon of Korea JoongAng Daily stated that "The girls' ability to overcome the sudden difficulty was proven by the fans' choice to stick through the technical error...It probably wasn't the first concert the band or the fans had in mind, but it was a performance only (G)I-dle could have pulled off."

The group re-enters at number 46 on Billboard Social 50.

In 2021, Interpark has released their sales stats from 2020, (G)I-dle ranks at number 8 for all of Interpark’s Annual Concert Ratings and the second highest selling online music concert behind Iz*One Online Concert "Oneiric Theater" which ranked fourth overall.

== Set lists ==
This set list is representative of the show on July 5, 2020.
Cover songs are performed in I-Land ver.

1. "Lion"
2. "Hann (Alone)"
3. "Maze"
4. "What's Your Name"
5. "$$$"
6. "Blow Your Mind"
7. "Senorita"
8. "Why Do You Love Me" (original by Charlotte Lawrence) (Minnie)
9. "What About Us" (original by PINK) (Yuqi)
10. "What Now" (original by Rihanna) (Miyeon)
11. "Kiss It Better" (original by Rihanna) (Miyeon, Minnie, Yuqi)
12. "Majestic Scene" (Note: A remix version of Dance of the Yi People composed by Siixk Jun) (Shuhua)
13. "Trampoline" (original by Shaed) (Soojin)
14. "Hey Mama" (original by David Guetta) (Soyeon)
15. "Put It Straight"
16. "Oh My God"
17. "Luv U"
18. "Maybe"
19. "Pop/Stars" (original by K/DA)
20. "Latata"

Encore

21. "Uh-Oh"
22. "I'm the Trend"

== Personnel ==
Artists

- Miyeon
- Minnie
- Soojin
- Soyeon
- Yuqi
- Shuhua

Dancers

- Star System

Presented

- Cube Entertainment

Organized

- Live Nation
- CJ ENM

Ticket

- Interpark

== I-Land: Who Am I World Tour ==
The tour was a planned worldwide commenced with one show in Thailand on April 4, 2020, and spanning across 18 countries including United States, Mexico, Netherlands, Spain, Poland, Australia, Malaysia, Indonesia, Japan, South Korea and more until it was postponed due to the COVID-19 pandemic.

=== Cancelled shows ===
List of cancelled concerts, showing date, city, country, venue, reason for cancellation and reference
Date	City	Country	Venue	Reason
Leg 1 - Asia				COVID-19 pandemic
April 4, 2020	Bangkok	Thailand	–	COVID-19 pandemic
Leg 2 - North America				COVID-19 pandemic
April 13, 2020	Seattle	United States	Moore Theatre	COVID-19 pandemic
April 15, 2020	San Jose	United States	City National Civic	COVID-19 pandemic
April 17, 2020	Los Angeles	United States	Wiltern Theatre	COVID-19 pandemic
April 19, 2020	Phoenix	United States	The Van Buren	COVID-19 pandemic
April 21, 2020	Houston	United States	House of Blues	COVID-19 pandemic
April 23, 2020	Atlanta	United States	Buckhead Theatre	COVID-19 pandemic
April 25, 2020	Raleigh	United States	The Ritz	COVID-19 pandemic
April 26, 2020	Washington	United States	Fillmore Washington	COVID-19 pandemic
April 28, 2020	Philadelphia	United States	Theatre of Living Arts	COVID-19 pandemic
April 30, 2020	Montclair	United States	Wellmont Theater	COVID-19 pandemic
May 1, 2020	Boston	United States	House of Blues	COVID-19 pandemic
May 3, 2020	Toronto	Canada	Rebel	COVID-19 pandemic
May 5, 2020	Chicago	United States	House of Blues	COVID-19 pandemic
May 6, 2020	Minneapolis	United States	Fillmore Minneapolis	COVID-19 pandemic
Leg 3 - Latin America				COVID-19 pandemic
May 9, 2020	Monterrey	Mexico	Escena Monterrey	COVID-19 pandemic
May 10, 2020	Mexico City	Mexico	Auditorio BB	COVID-19 pandemic
Leg 4 - Europe				COVID-19 pandemic
May 17, 2020	Amsterdam	Netherlands	–	COVID-19 pandemic
May 20, 2020	Paris	France	–	COVID-19 pandemic
May 22, 2019	Berlin	Germany	–	COVID-19 pandemic
May 24, 2020	London	England	–	COVID-19 pandemic
May 26, 2020	Madrid	Spain	–	COVID-19 pandemic
May 28, 2020	Warsaw	Poland	–	COVID-19 pandemic
Leg 5 - Oceania				COVID-19 pandemic
June 5, 2020	Melbourne	Australia	–	COVID-19 pandemic
June 7, 2020	Sydney	Australia	–	COVID-19 pandemic
Leg 6 - Asia				COVID-19 pandemic
June 13, 2020	Manila	Philippines	–	COVID-19 pandemic
June 20, 2020	Kuala Lumpur	Malaysia	–	COVID-19 pandemic
June 28, 2020	Macau	China	–	COVID-19 pandemic
July 5, 2020	Taipei	Taiwan	–	COVID-19 pandemic
July 11, 2020	Jakarta	Indonesia	–	COVID-19 pandemic
–	Tokyo	Japan	–	COVID-19 pandemic
–	Seoul	South Korea	–	COVID-19 pandemic
