= Dumdi Dumdi =

2020 single album by (G)I-dle

- Digital and streaming cover

Single album by (G)I-dle
- Released: August 3, 2020
- Studio: Cube Studio
- Genre: K-pop; dance-pop; tropical
- Length: 6:55
- Language: Korean
- Label: Cube; Republic

(G)I-dle chronology
I Trust (2020)	Dumdi Dumdi (2020)	Oh My God (2020)

Singles from Dumdi Dumdi
- 1. "I'm the Trend" Released: July 7, 2020; 2. "Dumdi Dumdi" Released: August 3, 2020

Dumdi Dumdi (Korean: 덤디덤디; RR: Deomdi Deomdi, stylized as DUMDi DUMDi) is the first single album by South Korean girl group (G)I-dle. The single album was released digitally and physically on August 3, 2020, by Cube Entertainment in both a Korean and Chinese version. The physical version is available in two versions: "Day" and "Night". The single contains two tracks, including the lead single of the same name. The group participated in visual concept planning such as hair, makeup, and styling, and leader Soyeon participated in lyrics, composition, and arrangement. Commercially, the album recorded 94,587 copies of one-week sales, making (G)I-dle the second girl group to break the single album sales record.

== Background and promotions ==
Following the release of I Trust with "Oh My God" on April 6 and "I'm the Trend" on July 7, it was announced on July 14 that (G)I-dle would be making a comeback in early August. On July 17, the group unveiled the song name and release date through an artwork teaser image decorated with beaches and palm trees that expressed the heat and passion of summer. Three hours earlier, the song was first teased by Cube with a video including the phrase "#DDDD".

Beginning July 21, Cube Entertainment released individual comments about the song to the press with their concept photos. Through this, (G)I-dle showcased their individual colours and concepts. Member Soojin commented that the song "is an exciting song that you'll want to dance to if you listen to it.: With the release of Minnie's teaser photo, the media reported that the group's concept is "A wanderer who enjoys freedom". According to Soyeon, the song is a bright and easy-going song with straightforward, intuitive lyrics and addictive melodies that express (G)I-dle's type of summer. "I hope you enjoy the summer while listening to our fiery, trendy and refreshing song." Furthermore, Yuqi commented, "It's good to listen when you're driving, or when you go out with friends". She described the song as a dance song where listeners can feel (G)I-dle's special summer with melodies reminiscent of summer and youth. The youngest member, Shuhua, commented that the song is a "very exciting and bright song".

For the release of Dumdi Dumdi, (G)I-dle took part in Naver's Happybean Good Action event. The donations collected through the campaign would be used to support psychological and mental health counseling treatment, snacks, and nutritional kits for medical staff through sports doctors during the COVID-19 pandemic in South Korea.

On August 3, the group held a media showcase, viewed by select media attendees from around the world before the song's digital release and hosted by broadcaster Ha Ji-young. The group performed the single and introduced its point choreography, the 'Drum Dance'.

== Artwork and packaging ==
(G)I-dle released two album versions for Dumdi Dumdi. The album was released in the form of a sticker book-like physical album with the Day version that captured the mid-day sunshine and the coolness of the pool, and the Night version exhibiting (G)I-dle's special home party scene.

== Singles ==
"When planning, we seem to focus on the keyword of the song. We want to come up with a new word like "Latata" and "Lion" to represent us, and for them [listeners] to remember us."

— (G)I-dle on naming the track's title.

"I'm the Trend" was announced on June 28, 2020, and was unveiled during their first online concert I-Land: Who Am I on July 5, 2020. The single was released digitally on July 7, 2020. The song was composed by members Minnie and Yuqi, Yuto of Pentagon and FCM Houdini. It was described as a Latin music-based dance song that boasts an exciting rhythm, features lyrics that reference their other hit songs as points such as "Oh My God", "Blow Your Mind", "Latata", "Lion", "Maze", "Uh-Oh" and "Senorita". The song failed to chart on Billboard's World Digital Songs chart, but charted at number 96 on South Korea's Gaon Digital Chart.

"Dumdi Dumdi" is (G)I-dle's summery dance song with tropical drum beats, a strong moombahton rhythm with booming percussion, a subtle "catchy" whistle hook, and the onomatopoeic refrain of "Dumdi Dumdi". It features candid and intuitive lyrics and addictive melodies such as 'hot, cool, passion, and excitement' that are reminiscent of the summer and youth.

== Commercial performance ==
On July 17, Biz Enter revealed Cube Entertainment's share price went up 4.42% from the previous trading day at 11:55 AM KST after announcing (G)I-dle's comeback schedule.

According to Hanteo, (G)I-dle's single album Dumdi Dumdi ranked second on Hanteo Weekly Physical Album Chart and recorded 94,587 copies sold after the first week. This puts Dumdi Dumdi as the second best selling girl group single album in history. Simultaneously, the single album charted at number two on the Gaon Album Chart and the Gaon Retail Album Chart with 73,826 units.

On August 18, 2020 (G)I-dle achieved a cumulative 500 million streams on Spotify. They became the first K-pop 4th generation girl group and the fifth K-pop girl group to achieve 500 million streams, accomplishing this roughly two years and three months after their debut.

== Track listing ==
Digital download
No.	Title	Lyrics	Music	Arrangement	Length
1.	"Dumdi Dumdi" (덤디덤디)	Soyeon	Soyeon; Pop Time	Pop Time; Soyeon	3:30
Total length:					3:30

Dumdi Dumdi — physical album
No.	Title	Lyrics	Music	Arrangement	Length
1.	"Dumdi Dumdi" (덤디덤디)	Soyeon	Soyeon; Pop Time	Pop Time; Soyeon	3:30
2.	"I'm the Trend"	Minnie; Yuqi; Soyeon; FCM Houdini	FCM Houdini; Minnie; Yuqi; Yuto	FCM Houdini; Yuto	3:25
Total length:					6:55

Exclusive single album — available on NetEase Music China and Apple Music China
No.	Title	Length
1.	"Dumdi Dumdi"	3:30
2.	"Dumdi Dumdi" (Chinese version)	3:30
Total length:		7:00

Notes

- "Dumdi Dumdi" (Chinese version) is written and guided by Yuqi and Z KING.

== Charts ==
Weekly sales chart performance for Dumdi Dumdi
Chart (2020)	Peak position
South Korean Albums (Gaon)	2

Monthly sales chart performance for Dumdi Dumdi
Chart (2020)	Peak position
South Korea (Gaon Album Chart)	6

Sales chart performance for singles from Dumdi Dumdi
Song	Chart (2020)	Peak position
"I'm the Trend"	South Korea (Gaon)	96
"I'm the Trend"	South Korea (K-pop Hot 100	58
"Dumdi Dumdi"	Hungary (Single Top 40)	15
"Dumdi Dumdi"	Singapore (RIAS)	29
"Dumdi Dumdi"	South Korea (Gaon)	8
"Dumdi Dumdi"	South Korea (K-pop Hot 100)	27
"Dumdi Dumdi"	US World Digital Song Sales (Billboard)	13

== Certifications and sales ==
Region	Certification	Certified units/sales
South Korea	—	124,815

== Release history ==
Release formats for Dumdi Dumdi
Region	Date	Format	Distributor	Ref.
South Korea	August 3, 2020	Digital download, streaming	Cube; Kakao M	
United States	August 3, 2020	Digital download, streaming	Cube; Republic	
Various	August 3, 2020	Digital download, streaming	Cube; U-Cube; Universal Music	
South Korea	August 4, 2020	CD	Cube; U-Cube; Universal Music	
Japan	August 4, 2020	CD	Cube; U-Cube	
