= Hwaa =

2021 single by (G)I-dle

Single by (G)I-dle

from the EP I Burn
- Language: Korean
- Released: January 11, 2021
- Studio: Cube Studio
- Genre: Moombahton; dark pop; dream pop; synth-pop
- Length: 3:17
- Label: Cube; Republic
- Songwriter: Soyeon
- Producers: Soyeon; Pop Time

(G)I-dle singles chronology
"More" (2020)	"Hwaa" (2021)	"Tomboy" (2022)

Music video
- "Hwaa" on YouTube

"Hwaa" (Korean: 화(火花); lit. '"Anger (Spark)"'; stylized in all caps) is a song recorded by South Korean girl group (G)I-dle, released on January 11, 2021, by Cube Entertainment and Republic Records as the lead single of the group's fourth extended play, I Burn. The song is written by member Soyeon and co-produced by Pop Time. The inspiration for the song came to Soyeon when member Shuhua once said 'winter girl' in a conversation. She took the idea and created the concept of a woman trapped in winter. Musically, it is a moombahton, dark pop, dream pop and synth-pop track with oriental instrumentations, and contains double entendres about fire and flowers. The song was the last single released by (G)I-dle as a sextet, before Soojin's departure from the group in August 2021.

Commercially, "Hwaa" became (G)I-dle's first top-five hit on the Gaon Digital Chart—peaking at number four—and became their first chart-topper on the component Download Chart. It additionally peaked at number five on K-pop Hot 100, number six on World Digital Songs and number 173 on Global Excl. U.S. chart. An English and Chinese version of the song was released as a digital single two weeks later on January 27, 2021. A remix version of the song by Dimitri Vegas & Like Mike was released on February 5.

== Name ==
"Hwaa" refers to a flower, and represents spring and love. It uses two different Chinese characters with one meaning 'fire' (火) and the other 'flower' (花). Both characters are pronounced the same way in Korean as /hwa/ without tonal differences (since modern Korean is a non-tonal language), but are read in Mandarin as /huǒ/ and /huā/, respectively. The extra letter 'a' in the title is for added stylistic purposes. Soyeon said: "The reason I chose to put those two hwa's together is because the song features a narrator who is in winter but will burn the cold away and bloom like a flower and bring spring to them." Firework in Korean is 'fire flower', and Soyeon adds: "I hope the album will be a success that bursts like the blaze of a firework."

== Background ==
In an interview with Marie Claire Korea for the January edition, Soyeon hinted that the song, "[is] suitable for winter, but it won’t be just cold. It's going to be cold but somehow hot? Like the feeling of being covered in a thick blanket in a room with the boiler on, but because the windows are opened, only your face feels cold." "Hwaa" is (G)I-dle's second breakup song that gives off the chilly and bitterly cold winter vibe from a break-up.

"The three symbols present in I Burn, 'Winter' represents the frozen cold emotions following a breakup, and 'Fire' represents the desire to melt those feelings. The 'Flower' represents the cold but beautiful love that follows a breakup.” [...] It started with the image of a woman trapped in winter. "I wanted to include 'Winter', 'Fire' and 'Flower' in the word 'Hwaa' [to] contain the meaning of overcoming the wounds of separation and in full bloom."

— (G)I-dle on "Hwaa"'s concept, Korea Economic Daily

"Rather than conveying a certain concept, we put more thought into how to best convey the emotions. Although we are a multinational group, we wanted to convey emotions, since feelings about breakups are universal. I hope that these emotions feel like a novel." In response, Minnie confessed she had a hard time to understand how to express the word 'Hann' [(Alone in winter)] in Thai, but after talking with the members, she was able to understand the feelings of love and separation. "I tried hard to express my feelings for parting because (all countries) are similar." The choreography features sword dance moves, choreographed by Hyunzzinii and Performance Director Kim Sehwan. In SBS Originals Hanbam, Minnie revealed that "Hwaa" is a song which Soyeon produced after they appear on Mnet's survival show Queendom and "Lion", and before "Dumdi Dumdi". The group waited and aimed to release "Hwaa" that suits the cold weather.

== Music and lyrics ==
"Welcoming spring by lighting a fire in a frozen heart like winter. I thought a lot to tell the story a break-up. The feeling of 'Hann' [(Alone in winter)] would have left regrets. I thought about whether there was regret [or it] might be a cold feeling like winter, so I thought it would be nice to burn that feeling."

— Soyeon on the meaning of "Hwaa",

The song is composed in the key of F♯ minor, 95 beats per minute with a running time of 3:17 minutes. "Hwaa" is a dark pop, dream pop, synth-popdark, and moombahton track with an oriental musical instrument added to the arrangement, and has double entendres about fire and flower with addictive hook and lyrics that show gradual change. The song is entirely in Korean. "Hwaa" is described as a song that expresses the feelings after a breakup with the ambiguous subject of hwa. The song sings about the pain of love using the burning fire and colourful flowers in the cold winter sensibility as a metaphor. The song is the continuation of the storyline from "Hann (Alone)" (2018) and "Hann (Alone in winter)" (2021). An accompanying music video for the song was directed by Paranoid Paradigm of VM Project Architecture and uploaded onto (G)I-dle's YouTube channel simultaneously with the single's release.

== Critical reception ==
Professional ratings
Review scores
Source	Rating
IZM	3/5 stars
The Kraze	9.5/10

"Hwaa" was met with generally positive reviews from music critics. Writing for Benedetta Geddo of Teen Vogue praised (G)I-dle's for their "undeniable talent for grand-scale storytelling and visuals in both their songs and music videos." Heran Mamo from Billboard describes the song as "ignites one's inner-fire to avoid the cold feelings brought on by a breakup". Mike Wass of Idolator called the song "an instantly catchy banger". Cho Seung-hyeon of Seoul Economic Daily praised the team's "strong and unique concept every comeback without mundane [and] have never presented a concept expressed in common words". He also wrote, he was somewhat amazed how foreign fans found the fully Korean lyrics "appealing" and the "[usage] of oriental instruments" in the song. Rolling Stone India's Riddhi Chakraborty characterized it as a "dark and dreamy synth-pop" track and acclaimed it "an anthem about moving on from painful memories". In The Quietus, reviewer Verónica A. Bastardo wrote that the song is "a looping journey between the rhythmic drums of dancehall and open, airy spaces. The singer's emotional voices, a bright, East Asian-sounding string instrument at the back and wind sound effects make up the details that transport you to a dark unknown wood where you can see flowers bloom even within the fire." Lim Dong-yeop of IZM wrote in his review, "(G)I-dle, who have captured the public with their intense images, took out a new card this time." "They naturally mix the fire and flowers of 'fire' with oriental beauty."

Music critic, Kim Yun-ha called the song "crazy"—meaning "a state in which words and actions are different from ordinary people due to a mental abnormality, but also refers to a state of being devoted to one object to the extent of mental abnormalities." She further explained that the song "breaks away from normal especially the latter madness is always a fascinating subject for creators who have to create something that has never been in the world." She deemed the group members as "extremely rare crazy female characters through K-pop, from releasing a charismatic debut song "Latata", [...] bizarre and grotesque horror drama "Put It Straight", [...] breaking down the line between good and bad in "Oh My God" that has long been considered as sacred to female idol, [...] gave themselves the crown of a Lion King instead of a queen [...] After giving a breath of fresh air with "Dumdi Dumdi" during the hot wind summer, (G)I-dle's "Hwaa" revives the fire of the path they have walk in, spreading the fire on the love that they sought as they sing a song of destruction and reincarnation." She trusted leader Soyeon's words that "(G)I-dle is a team that breaks stereotype", and concluded positively in her review, "(G)I-dle walks on as they break stereotypes. Crazy or not."

Writing for Beats Per Minute, JT Early described "Hwaa" as it "feels like a winter dusk where the only warmth is from internal rage. The song is bittersweet, simultaneously acknowledging pain but also detailing a cold heart slowly thawing out giving an ultimate message of hope. Although the track ends abruptly, this is still a unique and affecting song that only echoes the loneliness and heartbreak many people are experiencing in our pandemic times."

"Hwaa" on critic lists
Critic/Publication	List	Rank
Billboard	25 Best K-Pop Songs 2021	24
Rolling Stone India	21 Best Korean Music Videos of 2021	7

== Commercial performance ==
"Hwaa" was a commercial success in South Korea, debuting at number 4 on the Gaon Digital Chart. On the second week of charting, "Hwaa" rose twelve spots from seventeenth to fifth place on the Billboard K-pop Hot 100 chart. In the United States, the song debuted at number 8 and peaked at number 6 on Billboard World Digital Song Sales chart, giving (G)I-dle their tenth top-10 hit. It also debuted at number 173 on Billboard Global Excl. U.S., giving their second entry on the chart, after "More".

== Track listing ==
- Download and streaming
1. "Hwaa" – 3:17
- Digital single
1. "Hwaa (English Ver.)" – 3:17
2. "Hwaa (火/花)" (Chinese Ver.) – 3:17
- Digital single – Dimitri Vegas & Like Mike remix
1. "Hwaa (Dimitri Vegas & Like Mike Remix)" – 2:55

== Credits and personnel ==
Credits are adapted from Cube Entertainment, NetEase Music, and Melon.

=== Song credits ===
- (G)I-dle – Vocals
  - Soyeon – Producer, songwriter, rap arrangement, audio engineer, background vocal, vocal director
  - Yuqi – Vocal director, Chinese translation (Chinese version)
- Pop Time – producer, audio engineer
- Dimitri Vegas & Like Mike – Audio engineer (Remix version)
- Sophia Pae – Vocal director (English version)
- Phildel – English translation (English version)
- Z KING – Vocal director (Chinese version)
- Jeon Jae-hee – Background vocal
- Kim Dong-min – Guitar
- Park Ji-yong – Keyboard
- Shin Jae-bin (Cube Studio) – Record engineering
- Choi Ye-ji (Cube Studio) – Record engineering
- Mr. Cho (JoeLab) – Audio mixing (Chinese version)
- Jeon Bo-yeon (JoeLab) – Assistant audio mixing, digital editor (Chinese version)
- Kwon Nam-woo (821 Sound mastering) – Audio mastering
- Jang Seung-ho (821 Sound mastering) – Assistant audio mastering
- Maurice Sudhakar (Bizzy Studios) – Audio mixing, audio mastering (Remix version)
- Daniel Kim (Bizzy Studios) – Audio mixing (Remix version)
- Daniel Kim (DAMN) (Bizzy Studios) – remix sync (Remix version)

=== Visual credits ===
- Paranoid Paradigm (VM Project Architecture) – music video director
- Kim Sehwan (Star System) – performance director
- Hyunzzinii (Star System) – choreographer

== Promotion ==
(G)I-dle kicked off promotions by appearing on Naver Now Gossip Idle (소문의 아이들). It is a 3-part comeback project and viewable audio show every Tuesday at 11 pm KST on January 5, 12 and 19. Every episode was decorated with the concept of 'talk and listen' to all the songs in the album and listeners can hear various stories related to the song work, behind the album jacket and music video shooting. The global entertainment platform Makestar opened the one-on-one video call event page from December 30, 2020 – January 10, 2021, to commemorate the release of the album. The group also partnered up with Ktown4u, and MyMusicTaste. On January 8, (G)I-dle appeared on KBS 2TV's All Year Live. On January 13, the group appeared on MBC Every 1 variety show Weekly Idol. The episode was recorded on December 28, 2020. (G)I-dle also promoted the song on various shows, including KBS Cool FM's Day6's Kiss the Radio, SBS Power FM's Cultwo Show, Deeva Jessica's Special Live: (G)I-dle with Jeon Soyeon~, Naver Now Hyojung's Avengirls, SBS Power FM Lee Jun's Youngstreet, and Naver Now Ravi's Question Mark. The group performed three songs including "Hwaa" on You Hee-yeol's Sketchbook episode 524.

The group also promoted the song with a series of live performances on various music programs starting with Mnet's M! Countdown on January 14. This was followed by performances on KBS's Music Bank, MBC's Show! Music Core, SBS' Inkigayo, MBC Music's Show Champion, and SBS MTV's The Show.

== Music video ==
The music video for "Hwaa" was directed by director Paranoid Paradigm of VM Project Architecture production team, and was uploaded to (G)I-dle's official YouTube channel on January 11, 2021. After 17 hours of the released, the music video topped No. 1 in both South Korea and worldwide YouTube trending. Within 24 hours, it surpassed 5 million views, and later surpassed 10 million views in 29 hours. On January 14, the video crossed 20 million views. With the released of the music video, (G)I-dle's YouTube views reached 67 million views. Among them, India recorded the highest share with 15.5%, followed by Korea with 14%, Indonesia with 6.5%, Philippines with 6.4% and Vietnam with 4.1%. In a week, the music video surpassed 40 million views. As of June 2021, it has over seventy seven million views on YouTube, while its dance practice version has surpassed three million views.

An official lyric video and a choreography version for the song was released on January 18 and 19, respectively.

=== Synopsis ===
Three scenes in the music video where (G)I-dle shows three visual concepts of 'Winter', 'Flower' and 'Fire'.

The music video opens with a scene where the members meet their eyes in front of a tree that was once lush but dried and twisted. Singing, "As if a cold winter has struck/the time freezes/and the darkness that seems to contain the brutal wind gets deeper and escapes/Let's erase the endless seasons without weakness/Alone scars on the hot days." In the video, Miyeon, Minnie, Soojin, Soyeon, Yuqi and Shuhua showed strong eye contact, weak expressions of resentment towards the parting partner. Miyeon appeared in a hime cut, Yuqi wearing a short wig, Minnie in bright red straight bangs, Soyeon in silver coloured-hair, and other members' unconventional hair styling using hairpins while carrying props such as umbrellas and fans. Performing in outfits that contain the three visual concepts of 'Winter', 'Fire' and 'Flower'. The group performed as they were blooming flowers against the backdrop of a cool blue snowy field, while Soyeon rapping in a tree nest. The phrase "Fire, burn, and bloom" continues like a spell to set fire to the frozen heart like winter and make spring to bloom. As Soojin sings the first verse, the pre-chorus and chorus explained how it's time to fight against a frozen and snowy heart by igniting even just a single spark, by blooming even just a single flower. The music video ends with a group dance to the melody with an intense chorus of "Hwaa".

=== Reception ===
Benedetta Geddo of Teen Vogue praised the group's music video and stated, "The meaning of the song is reflected back beautifully in the cinematic and grandiose music video, which has by now become an IDLE staple. Members Soyeon, Miyeon, Minnie, Soojin, Yuqi, and Shuhua move through sets that are cold and desolate before morphing into fiery triumphs of red and vibrant colour — their styling also complements the sets, calling back to traditional dresses and accessories from East Asia." Portal Popline's Caian Nunes noted that the music video uses "mix elements of nature with futuristic structures", and moved by "the richness of details in each setting, [...] as well as in the costumes." Nattamon Khom Loi from The Standard Pop wrote that "Combined with deep music In-ear lyrics with the sequence of images and the colour tones in the music video, it represents the passing of the drought to bloom very well." Riddhi Chakraborty of Rolling Stone India connected the music video with "Oh My God" and cited the video "moves from cold blues and whites to fiery red as the members embrace their own strength and ability to move past the trials of life."

== Accolades ==
(G)I-dle received their first Melon Popularity Award on January 25, 2021, with 67.5 points. "Hwaa" managed to achieve a total of 10 music show trophies by February 4, 2021 including triple crown (three consecutive wins) on M Countdown and double crown (two consecutive wins) on Show! Music Core and Inkigayo becoming the group's most-winning title track and the first girl group outside of the "Big 3" to accomplish this since Mamamoo "Yes I Am" in 2017.

Awards
Year	Organization	Category	Result	Ref.
2021	Asian Pop Music Awards	Best Lyricist (Overseas)	Nominated	
2021	JOOX Malaysia Top Music Awards	Top 5 K-Pop Hits (Mid Year)	Won	
2022	Gaon Chart Music Awards	Artist of the Year (Digital Music) – January	Nominated	
2022	Golden Disc Awards	Digital Song Bonsang	Nominated	

Music program awards (10 total)
Program	Date	Ref.
Show Champion	January 20, 2021	
M Countdown	January 21, 2021	
M Countdown	January 28, 2021	
M Countdown	February 4, 2021	
Music Bank	January 22, 2021	
Show! Music Core	January 23, 2021	
Show! Music Core	January 30, 2021	
Inkigayo	January 24, 2021	
Inkigayo	January 31, 2021	
The Show	January 26, 2021	

Melon Popularity Award
Award	Date (2021)	Ref.
Weekly Popularity Award	January 25, 2021	
Weekly Popularity Award	February 1, 2021	

== Dimitri Vegas & Like Mike remix ==
"Hwaa (Dimitri Vegas & Like Mike Remix)"
- Cover artwork used in for the remix.

Remix by (G)I-dle
- Released: February 5, 2021
- Recorded: 2021
- Genre: EDM
- Length: 2:55
- Label: Cube; Republic
- Songwriter: Soyeon
- Producers: Soyeon; Pop Time; Dimitri Vegas & Like Mike

Music video
- "HWAA (Dimitri Vegas & Like Mike Remix)" on YouTube

On February 5, 2021, a remix by Belgian DJ duo Dimitri Vegas & Like Mike titled "Hwaa (Dimitri Vegas & Like Mike Remix)" was released for digital download and on streaming platforms.

=== Background ===
(G)I-dle announced a remix of the song by a world-renowned Belgian DJ duo Dimitri Vegas & Like Mike on January 31, 2021. The collaboration is the group's first collaboration with a global artist since their debut, as well as the DJ duo first Korean group to work with. Prior to the announcement, the brothers followed the Korean pop group since January after "Hwaa" was released. Dimitri Vegas shared the song's music video Twitter post which was posted on January 11, and tweeted with three fire emojis and tagged "@likemike" on January 23. A Cube representative said, "Through this collaboration, we will not only expand the musical spectrum, but also take a leap forward as a global artist."

=== Composition ===
The song is arranged in the electronic dance music genre performed predominantly in English, with verses in Korean, composed in the key of F♯ minor, 118 beats per minute with a running time of 2:55 minutes.

== Charts ==
Chart (2021)	Peak position
Singapore (RIAS)	19
South Korea (Gaon Digital)	4
South Korea (K-pop Hot 100)	5
US World Digital Song Sales (Billboard)	6

=== Year-end chart ===
Chart (2021)	Peak position
South Korea (Gaon)	131

== Certifications ==
Region	Certification	Certified units/sales
Brazil (Pro-Música Brasil)	Gold	20,000^{‡}
^{‡} Sales+streaming figures based on certification alone.

== "Hwaa (Loveless Heroine version)" ==
A re-recorded version of "Hwaa", titled "Hwaa (Loveless Heroine version)", was released by Minnie on July 15, 2022, via Thailand's webtoon Loveless Heroine (วันทองไร้ใจ) by Mu.

== Release history ==
Region	Date	Version	Format	Distributor
Various	January 11, 2021	Korean	Digital download; streaming	Cube; Kakao M; U-Cube; Republic Records
Various	January 27, 2021	English; Chinese	Digital download; streaming	Cube; Kakao M; U-Cube; Republic Records
Various	February 5, 2021	Remix	Digital download; streaming	Cube; Kakao M; U-Cube; Republic Records
Various	July 15, 2022	Thailand	Digital download; streaming	Cube; Kakao M; U-Cube; Republic Records

== See also ==
- List of K-pop songs on the Billboard charts
- List of Music Bank Chart winners (2021)
- List of M Countdown Chart winners (2021)
- List of Show! Music Core Chart winners (2021)
- List of Inkigayo Chart winners (2021)
