= I Burn =

2021 EP by (G)I-dle

- Digital and streaming cover

EP by (G)I-dle
- Released: January 11, 2021
- Recorded: 2020
- Studio: Cube Studio
- Length: 18:40
- Languages: Korean; English
- Labels: Cube; Republic; Kakao M

(G)I-dle chronology
Oh My God (2020)	I Burn (2021)	I Never Die (2022)

Physical edition cover
- Winter, Flower and Fire versions, left to right

Singles from I Burn
- 1. "Hwaa" Released: January 11, 2021

I Burn (stylized in sentence case) is the fourth Korean extended play (sixth overall) by South Korean girl group (G)I-dle. It was released on January 11, 2021, by Cube Entertainment and Republic Records. The EP consists of three physical versions: Winter, Flower and Fire, and contains six tracks, including the lead single "Hwaa". The album contains various emotions felt in the process of regaining happiness after separation. I Burn is the fourth of the 'I' series, which started from the debut album, I Am (2018). Commercially, the EP surpassed 200,000 copies, making it the group's first project to do so. I Burn is the group's final release as a sextet, before Soojin's hiatus and subsequent departure from the group in August 2021.

== Background and promotion ==
On December 9, Newsen reported that (G)I-dle would be making a comeback in mid-January. Cube Entertainment confirmed the news, stating, "(G)I-dle is preparing for a comeback with goals for release in mid-January. Please look forward to their return." On December 27, Cube released a visual film announcing their comeback through the official YouTube channel of the group. The video features various elements of nature such as rain, fire, flowers, and butterflies. On December 28, the group confirmed the album title in a post across all the group's social media accounts, and that I Burn would be released on January 11, 2021. On December 31, (G)I-dle revealed the album's track-list on their social media. On January 2, 2021, the concept preview video of the album was released. On January 6, the group released the highlight medley for their new album.

On January 11, the group held an online media showcase for the release of I Burn hosted by broadcaster Oh Jung-yeon, who appeared in I'm a Survivor with Yuqi. During the showcase, Yuqi described the intro song "Hann (Alone in Winter)" as a song that connects with the digital single "Hann (Alone)" and the title song "Hwaa". "It's similar to "Hann" but it gives a different feel to it."

"I Burn as a 'novel' that begins with the image of a woman in the cold, her heart frozen in the bitter winter of a break-up. By confronting it, she melts the ice that traps her. The fire of acceptance enables the growth of new love in the form of a flower and the arrival of spring.

— (G)I-dle described the six tracks of I Burn, Teen Vogue

== Music and lyrics ==
Members Minnie, Soyeon and Yuqi participated in the composing and writing of I Burn. (G)I-dle explained that I Burn is about various emotions felt in the process of regaining happiness after separation. "Hann (Alone in Winter)" represents the cold aftermath of a breakup; "Hwaa" is about getting over a heartbreaking farewell; "Moon" touches on the desire to hide one's feelings; and "Where is Love" explores the emptiness of love. "Hann (Alone in Winter)" is a song composed, written and arranged by Soyeon and Ahn Ye-eun. It tells the change of feelings as winter comes from the lonely being alone through betrayal and separation. Minnie, who is in charge of composing "Moon" described that the song contains honest feelings that cannot be shown to others. "I personally cherish it so much." The song was composed by Minnie with the thought of the Moon. Regarding "Dahlia", Minnie explained that the song depicts two opposite meanings; greed and attraction. "It's a song that I studied hard and wrote the lyrics to see if I can express the flowers beautifully." The songs were arranged based on the stories in the lyrics. Minnie explained, "there is a sense of connectivity from the first track through the last track. That's why the story of getting burned by a breakup and then growing into something stronger is easy to follow throughout I Burn. It begins with "Hann (Alone in Winter)", a song about separation, and ends with "Dahlia", an uplifting track named after a flower."

=== Songs ===
The opening track, "Hann (Alone in Winter)" is a medium-tempo ballad that connects the group's 2018 single "Hann (Alone)" with the album's title track "Hwaa". The second song, "Hwaa" is a moombahton song that adds a cool sensibility to an oriental musical instrument. "Moon", the third song is a pop track about honest feelings. "Where is love" is a disco retro styled dance song with a funky bass. The song is about feelings after parting. "Lost", the fifth song, is an R&B song. The closing track, "Dahlia", is a medium pop genre song with the theme of a Dahlia flower.

== Critical reception ==
Professional ratings
Review scores
Source	Rating
Beats Per Minute	75/100
Elite Daily	positive
The Kraze	7.5/10
The Quietus	positive

Gab Ginsberg and Jason Lipshutz writing for Billboard describe "Dahlia" as "[a] riveting garden that is "Dahlia", where Miyeon, Minnie, Soojin, Soyeon, Yuqi and Shuhua sing about a love that can't be tainted by outsider critics. Oh Jung-yeon praised (G)I-dle for their songwriting and stated, "Listening to the explanation of the philosophy and emotions of the six members melted into each song, I suddenly wanted to call them 'teachers'." Heran Mamo from Billboard, regarded the album as, "together musical arrangements and Eastern instrumentation to collect the pieces of a broken heart, as I Burn describes the aftermath of a painful breakup through the motif of a blazing fire and the sequential triumph like a blooming flower." Michele Mendez of Elite Daily affirmed that I Burn is "the breakup album everyone needs to hear because it's a reminder something beautiful can emerge from darkness." Writing for The Quietus online publication, Verónica A. Bastardo remarked: "A theatrical extended player, flooded with grandiloquent orchestral instrumentals mixed with pop structures and EDM drops, that explores in a metaphorical way the path of regaining happiness and strength after the separation from a loved one."

Writing for Beats Per Minute, JT Early gave the album a score of 75/100, describing the material as "surprising and emotional project from a girl-group who have sheathed their sharpness to start repairing their internal hurt" [...] "further established them as one of the most versatile girl-groups in the industry". In the review, the author emphasize that "these songs are self-produced and self-written by the members themselves, as their output has been for years." and concluded "by wholly committing to this concept of defeat and resurrection, they have created a project that is not only relatable and inspiring to listeners, but also an exercise in transparency from the group itself." The Kraze magazine gave the album a rating of 7.5/10 points and overall score including lead single and music video of 8.6/10 points, praising the production work by Soyeon, Minnie and Yuqi and the member's unique vocal colours.

Year-end lists
Critic/Publication	List	Rank	Ref.
Rolling Stone India	10 Best K-pop Albums of 2021	10	

== Commercial performance ==
According to Hanteo Chart, I Burn debuted at No. 1 on the daily album chart with 75,510 copies sold. This is higher by 19,147 copies compared to (G)I-dle's Dumdi Dumdi album released on August 3, 2020, which recorded 56,363 copies in first-day sales. The album also debuted at No.1 on Gaon Retail Album Chart with 59,086 copies sold. On January 13, it was reported that the album charted on iTunes Top Album charts in 52 regions around the world, including the Netherlands, New Zealand, Canada, Russia, Brazil, Italy and Finland. Moreover, on iTunes I Burn spent 3 days atop the summit of the iTunes Worldwide Albums Chart, beating out the record of their previous EP, I Trust. In Melon chart, (G)I-dle not only charted "Hwaa", but also all the songs from I Burn. This is the first time that the group has made such achievement since its debut in 2018.

On the chart issued January 10–16, 2021, I Burn debuted at number 3 on South Korea's Gaon Album Chart, and Gaon Weekly Retail Album Chart. It also scored their best one-week sales with 115,500 copies. Moreover, all songs in the EP entered the Gaon Digital Chart.

The US-released on April 30, 2021, the album debuted at number 10 on the US Billboard World Album, number 20 on the US Billboard Heatseekers Albums, and rank at number 22 on the Billboard Top Current Album Sales chart. They also charted at number 54 on Billboard Top Album Sales chart, making it their first entry on the chart, and peaked at number 20 on the Billboard Emerging Artists Chart since the released of I Trust (2020).

== Artwork and packaging ==
(G)I-dle released three physical album versions for I Burn. In Winter version (寒), the group showed a cold and lonely winter atmosphere wearing white dresses in a space full of antique props, lace fabrics, and lit candles. In Flower version (花), the group showed in dresses with colourful patterns that contrast with the cold blue background. In Fire version (火), the group shows their charms through shaking images that expressed as the fire is spreading while holding props reminiscent of a blazing flame in the pitch-black darkness and emit vivid light. Every version of the EP contains a sleeve, a booklet, a lyric paper, a CD, a CD package, a mini-poster, a postcard with a message on the card, a photo card, a lucky card and a sticker paper.

== Track listing ==
I Burn track listing
No.	Title	Lyrics	Music	Arrangement	Length
1.	"Hann (Alone in Winter)" (한(寒))	Soyeon; Ahn Ye-eun	Soyeon; Ahn Ye-eun	BreadBeat; Ahn Ye-eun; Soyeon	2:55
2.	"Hwaa" (화(火花))	Soyeon	Soyeon; Pop Time	Pop Time; Soyeon	3:17
3.	"Moon"	Soyeon	Minnie; FCM Houdini; FCM 667	FCM Houdini; Minnie	3:20
4.	"Where Is Love"	Soyeon	Soyeon; Lee Woo-min "Collapsedone"	Lee Woo-min "Collapsedone"	2:57
5.	"Lost"	Yuqi; Seo Jae-woo; Soyeon	Seo Jae-woo; Yuqi	Seo Jae-woo	3:01
6.	"Dahlia"	Minnie; BreadBeat; Soyeon	BreadBeat; Minnie	BreadBeat	3:10
Total length:					18:40

Notes

- "Hann (Alone in Winter)" stylized as "HANN (Alone in winter)".
- "Hwaa", "Moon", "Lost", and "Dahlia" stylized in all caps.
- "Where Is Love" stylized in sentence case.

== Accolades ==
I Burn was included in the mid-year list of South China Morning Post's Best K-pop albums of 2021, calling it "short and sweet" and an "intense, impassioned show of the band’s dynamic vocals, offering up the ultimate take on getting over a fiery love affair and its resulting break-up. [...] The cinematic album [...] incorporates elements of moombahton, nu-disco, R&B, and pop, blending with traditional Eastern musical elements to create something that is very 2021 and yet timeless."

Awards
Year	Organization	Category	Result	Ref.
2021	Mnet Asian Music Awards	Album of the Year	Nominated	
2022	Golden Disc Awards	Album Bonsang	Nominated	

== Charts ==
=== Weekly charts ===
Weekly sales chart performance for I Burn
Chart (2021)	Peak position
Japanese Albums (Oricon)	35
South Korean Albums (Gaon)	3
UK Album Downloads (Official Charts)	60
US Heatseekers Albums (Billboard)	20
US Top Album Sales (Billboard)	54
US Top Current Album Sales (Billboard)	33
US World Album (Billboard)	10

=== Monthly charts ===
Monthly sales chart performance for I Burn
Chart (2021)	Peak position
South Korea (Gaon Album Chart)	3

=== Year-end charts ===
Year-end chart performance for I Burn
Chart (2021)	Position
South Korean Albums (Gaon)	52

== Certifications and sales ==
Region	Certification	Certified units/sales
South Korea (KMCA)	Platinum	202,573

== Release history ==
Release dates and formats for I Burn
Region	Date	Format	Label
Various	January 11, 2021	Download; streaming	Cube; Republic; Kakao M; U-Cube
Various	January 12, 2021	CD	Cube; Republic; Kakao M; U-Cube
United States	April 30, 2021	CD	Cube; Republic
