= Oh My God ((G)I-dle song) =

2020 single by (G)I-dle

"Oh My God"

Single by (G)I-dle

from the EP I Trust
- Released: April 6, 2020
- Recorded: 2020
- Genre: Urban; hip-hop
- Length: 3:15
- Label: Cube; Kakao M
- Songwriter: Soyeon
- Producers: Soyeon; Big Sancho

(G)I-dle singles chronology
"Lion" (2019)	"Oh My God" (2020)	"I'm the Trend" (2020)

Music videos
- "Oh My God" on YouTube
- "Oh My God (Japanese ver.)" on YouTube

"Oh My God" (stylized in sentence case) is a song recorded by South Korean girl group (G)I-dle as the lead single for their third extended play I Trust. It was released in both Korean and English through Cube Entertainment and Kakao M on April 6, 2020. It is an urban hip hop track with trap and pop influence. Its lyrics revolve around the themes of self-trust, and contrasts between light and dark, purity and sin. It was written by Soyeon and composed by her and long-time collaborator Big Sancho, while the lyrics for the English version were translated by Lauren Kaori.

In South Korea, the song debuted and peaked at number 15 on the Gaon Digital Chart, and peaked at number 3 on the Billboard World Digital Songs chart. An accompanying music video, directed by Yoon Rima and Jang Dongju, was released alongside the single. It became (G)I-dle's third to reach 100 million views, after "Latata" and "Hann (Alone)", and was nominated for Best K-Pop Video at the 2020 MTV Video Music Awards.

== Background ==
"Oh My God" was released in Korean and English language. According to Miyeon, they included the English version specially for global fans for the now-postponed I-Land: Who Am I Tour. A Japanese version of the song was released on August 26, 2020, as the lead single from their 2nd Japanese EP Oh My God.

== Composition ==
"Oh My God" was written and co-produced by leader Soyeon, who also produced the group's popular songs from "Latata" to "Lion". "Oh My God" is an urban hip hop track with trap and pop influence in which the stark differences in rhythm that correspond to the atmospheric changes within the song stand out. The fantasy-like mood and bold production are led by a vintage piano sound, and strong 808 bass. In terms of musical notation, the song was written in the key of E minor, with a tempo of 110 BPM. The song's lyrics was conceptualized around the theme of 'self-trust' when encountering reality and experiencing feelings of rejection, confusion, recognition, and dignity. Crystal Bell from MTV describes the song as "a dark, trap-infused song with lyrics that riff on contrasts — light and dark, purity and sin — to communicate the idea that true divinity comes from knowing and trusting yourself."

"I didn't want to limit that 'she' to a certain being or a certain definition, so it's open to anything. I believe that all kinds of love are valuable and must be respected. That's why I don't want to limit 'she' to something specific."

— Soyeon talking about using 'She' in "Oh My God".

The specific lyrics "Oh my god / she took me to the sky / Oh my god / she showed me all the stars" sparked listeners questioning as to whom is being referred to. Soyeon responded that the imagery and lyrics represent love in many forms, and that she will leave it to the listener to interpret it their own way.

== Promotion ==
(G)I-dle had two versions of choreography, black (devil) and white (angel) to be performed on music shows. On April 9, the group performed the lead single for the first time on Mnet's M Countdown performing the black version, followed by performances on KBS' Music Bank for the white version, MBC's Show! Music Core, SBS Inkigayo, Arirang TV's Simply K-Pop, and SBS MTV's The Show.

On April 11, (G)I-dle held a special event, Oh My Call where 50 selected winners to participate the online fanmeeting. On April 25, the group held a comical prerecorded first solo concert, Safe House Concert through Hello82, with staff members were seen manually controlling strobe lights, rotating stage lights, making artificial stage fog with a diffuser and tossing confetti. (G)I-dle performed the single on 32nd Korea PD Awards which aired on April 29, 2020. On June 23, 2020, the group performed the single on KCON:TACT 2020 Summer. They also performed it on KBS Music Bank's Mid-Year Special: "Music Bank Cinema" on June 26.

== Critical reception ==
Karina Macias from Wild949 stated the song dives into various genres from Bollywood, pop, and trap and praising the group's soft and fierce looks in the music video. Crystal Bell from MTV wrote "Oh My God" is the natural evolution of their trendy sound, building on the seething tension of "Lion" and adding a slow, simmering drop primed for the Western market, like a cozy sonic and thematic companion to Ariana Grande's "God Is a Woman." Kim Do-heon of IZM describes the track "convincing both fun listening and watching" as it crosses the Latin pop beat of "Senorita" and the heavy sound of 808 bass.

Music critic Yang Sora from Tonplein placed the song at number 15 in her list of the best songs of 2020, praising the song's production and composition as well as the vocal skills of the group members. It was also ranked amongst the best K-pop songs of the year by Paper (28th), Dazed (18th), and Hypebae (unranked).

== Commercial performance ==
"Oh My God" debuted at number 97 in Scotland and at number 24 in Hungary, marking their first ever appearance on European chart. On April 17, 2020, they won their first public broadcast win on KBS's Music Bank. The group went on to win three additional award on SBS's Inkigayo, Mnet's M Countdown, and MBC's Show! Music Core, marking (G)I-dle's first grand slam music show win since debut. According to Amazer, "Oh My God" topped number one most covered K-Pop song for the month of April.

== Music video ==
Prior to its release, the song was accompanied by a music video teaser released midnight KST on April 6, 2020. The teaser exceeded 1 million views on YouTube in 11 hours. The music video opens with a solo dance by leader Soyeon in a white room which leads her to escape the reality and gradually spread into a dream. It contains dark visual elements such as scene that portrays confusion in ego with whole body soaked in purple liquid and red mud, black coloured body painting and pouring red liquid over ones face. Towards the end of the video, Soojin whispers "Ab imo pectore" meaning 'from the bottom of my heart' or 'with deepest affection' in Latin.

Choreography for the song was created by Star System while being directed by director Yoon Rima and Jang Dongju of Rigend Film production team. The assistant directors were Lee Yongoh, Kim Eunah, Lee Sunhyu, Choi Eunjeong and Koo Eunji. Other key personnel were production assistant Choi Seongjin, Park Sangcheol and Il Joo while the Character Generator was Kim Eunah, Lee Sunhyu, Choi Eunjeong and Koo Eunji, Kim Bo-hyeong, Lee Yerim and Bae Haeun. The Director of Photography were Yun Inmo (ATOD), Park Junhee as the Gaffer and Shin Gwiock (A:WE) as the Art Director.

A monotone lyric video for the song was released on April 8, and a dance practice video for "Oh My God" was released on April 12. On April 20, a special choreography video of "Oh My God" Heaven's version was released, showing their different charm as a gift for their fans for achieving 50 million views.

=== Reception ===
Mia Nazarena of Billboard was positive in an article about the album, praising the "dramatic scenes with visually stunning sets, finely-tuned choreography, and carefully curated costume changes". On April 7, 2020, it was announced that the music video amassed 17 million views within 24 hours of release. On April 13, the music video hit 50 million views on YouTube, becoming the group's fastest music video to reach this milestone. On July 9, 2020, "Oh My God" reached 100 million views three months after its release. Rolling Stone India named it the 4th best K-pop music video of 2020.

=== Plagiarism accusation ===
After the release of (G)I-dle's music video teaser, viewers pointed out that several scenes of the "Oh My God" teaser video are similar in appearance and colour to British pop singer FKA Twigs released song "Cellophane" music video, which was released in 2019. Soon afterwards, the controversy attracted the attention of FKA Twigs' fans causing the group's foreign fans to disproof and plunge into plagiarism claims, and continuing the arguments in overseas social networks. A representative from Cube Entertainment responded, "We have not yet grasped the exact situation. I'm going to find out more and resolve it."

== Accolades ==
Awards
Year	Organization	Category	Result	Ref.
2020	JOOX Hong Kong Top Music Awards	Top 20 Kpop songs	Nominated	
2020	MTV Video Music Award	Best K-Pop Video	Nominated	
2021	Golden Disc Awards	Best Female Performance Award	Won	

Music program awards
Program	Date	Ref.
M Countdown	April 16, 2020	
Music Bank	April 17, 2020	
Show! Music Core	April 18, 2020	
Inkigayo	April 19, 2020	

== Charts ==
=== Weekly charts ===
Chart (2020)	Peak position
Hungary (Single Top 40)	24
Scotland Singles (Official Charts)	97
Singapore (RIAS)	21
South Korea (Gaon)	15
South Korea (K-pop Hot 100)	10
US World Digital Song Sales (Billboard)	3

=== Monthly charts ===
Chart (2020)	Peak position
South Korea (Gaon)	29

=== Year-end chart ===
Chart (2020)	Peak position
South Korea (Gaon)	153

== Certifications ==
Region	Certification	Certified units/sales
Brazil (Pro-Música Brasil)	Platinum	40,000^{‡}
^{‡} Sales+streaming figures based on certification alone.

== Release history ==
Region	Date	Format	Distributor
Various	April 6, 2020	Digital download; streaming	Cube; Kakao M; U-Cube; Republic

== See also ==
- List of K-pop songs on the Billboard charts
- List of Inkigayo Chart winners (2020)
- List of M Countdown Chart winners (2020)
- List of Music Bank Chart winners (2020)
