= I Trust =

2020 EP by (G)I-dle

- Digital and Lie version cover

EP by (G)I-dle
- Released: April 6, 2020
- Recorded: 2019–2020
- Studio: Cube Studio
- Genres: K-pop; hip hop; Trap (EDM)
- Length: 16:33
- Languages: Korean; English
- Labels: Cube; Universal Music; Republic
- Producers: Soyeon; Big Sancho; Lee Woo-min "collapsedone"; Simon Hong(exec.)

(G)I-dle chronology
Latata (2019)	I Trust (2020)	Dumdi Dumdi (2020)

Alternative cover
- True version

Singles from I Trust
- 1. "Lion" Released: October 25, 2019; 2. "Oh My God" Released: April 6, 2020

I Trust (stylized in sentence case) is the third Korean extended play (fourth overall) by South Korean girl group (G)I-dle. It was released digitally on April 6, 2020, and physically on April 7, 2020, by Cube Entertainment. I Trust features 5 tracks including the previously released single "Lion" and the lead single "Oh My God", which was produced and written by Soyeon alongside Big Sancho. The physical version is available in two versions: "True" and "Lie". I Trust is the followup to their second EP I Made, released in 2019.

The EP debuted atop the Gaon Album Chart and became (G)I-dle's best selling work since debut, selling 112,075 copies in its first week.

== Background and release ==
"The goal of the album was to epitomize all emotions that one person can feel, and I wanted to put together both good and gloomy feelings in one album."

— Soyeon talking about I Trust.

On February 18, 2020, it was reported that (G)I-dle were set to comeback in mid-March ahead of their world tour I-Land: Who Am I. It was also reported that the group were filming a music video on the same day. The release, however, was postponed due to the COVID-19 pandemic.

On March 19, 2020, Cube Entertainment announced that (G)I-dle would be making a comeback with an extended play in early April. They had already completed their album jacket photoshoot, filming of the music video and were in the final stages of comeback preparations. Later the same month, Cube officially announced their comeback with the released artwork teaser image of the third EP I Trust through their official social network service. The teaser contains the album name and release date.

I Trust is (G)I-dle's third release in the 'I' series, following I Am and I Made. I Trust comes from setting the subject of belief as "myself". The theme of the album is 'I trust = I trust myself' and through this (G)I-dle showcases their own unique confidence. Soyeon revealed she got inspired by watching isekai anime, KonoSuba: God's Blessing on this Wonderful World! Legend of Crimson for the whole album concept.

== Artwork and packaging ==
(G)I-dle released two album versions for I Trust containing different colour themes which conveys a "collision with reality—meeting halfway between their reality and what society expects from them". In a white-colour theme, Lie version represents how the group see themselves as innocence, pure and trust in oneself. The black-colour theme, True is to represent how the society views them "even though we try to stick to our original goals".

== Music and composition ==
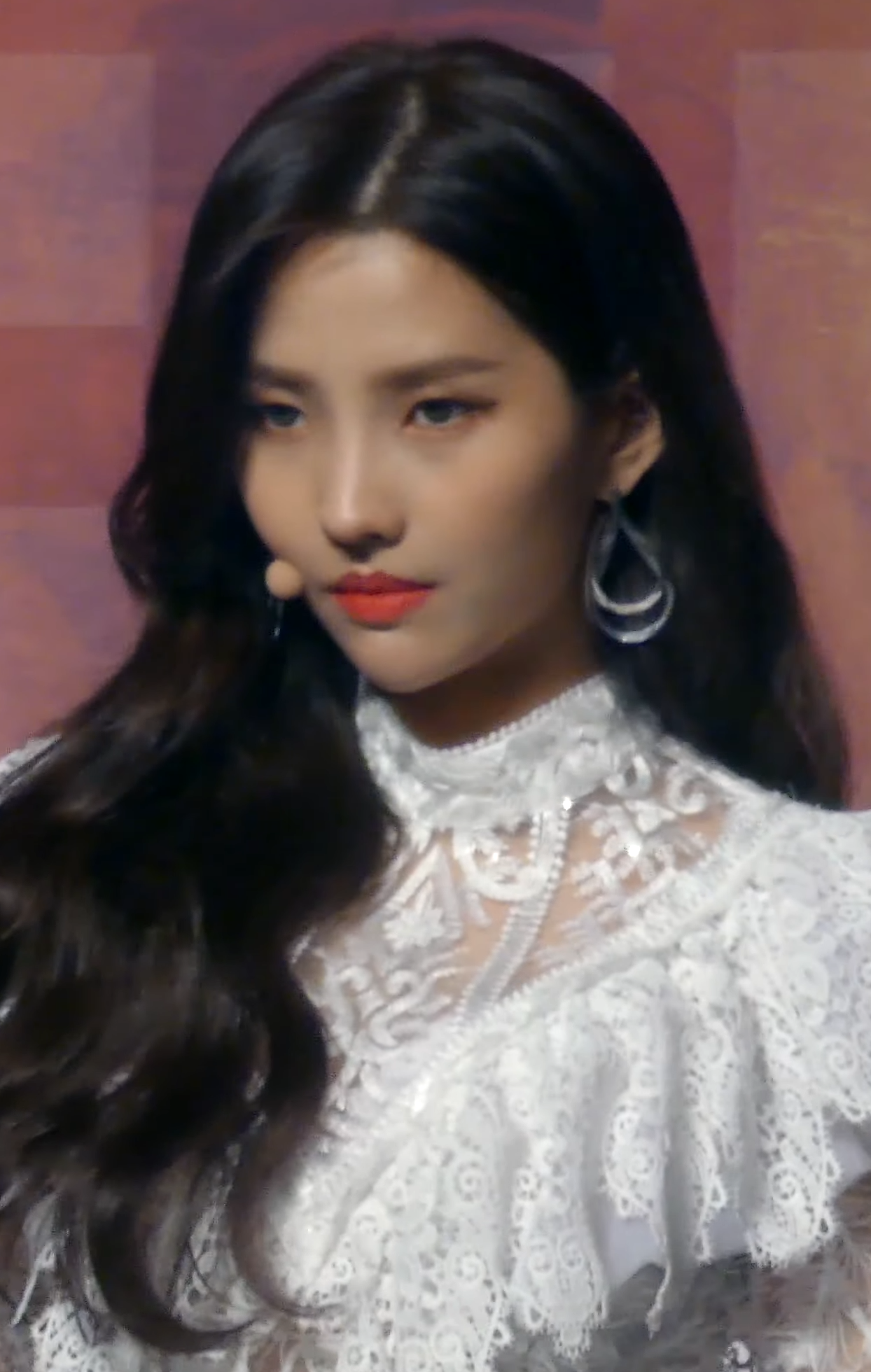
Soyeon wrote and co-produced all of the songs on "I Trust".

I Trust is an album that contains the personalities of (G)I-dle starting with 'I' and 'Trust' derived from believing in one self. The opening track of the album, "Oh My God" is an urban hip-hop track with a bold rhythm that changes with every development of the song, expressing the theme 'I can be confident just by believing in myself' while experiencing feelings of rejection and confusion.

"Luv U" is a trap song which combines heavy 808 bass, hard drum beats, and tongue-clicking sounds recorded by member Soyeon which creates a playful yet serious, bright but dark atmosphere. The lyrics express a strong energy of love and revolve around a situation when you have to believe in yourself. Soulbeats called it "borderline industrial, with pops, clicks, riffs that read more like sounds than music, but composed so deftly that they form a clear melody and rhythm".

"Maybe" is a dream-like dance-pop song that combines slow chord progression and minimalist electronic instrumentation, though the rubbery synths and staccato drums play against the scratched strings for a spectacular drop. It represents the confusion one faces when coming to believe in themselves.

== Promotion ==
On March 26, 2020, Cube Entertainment released a time table for (G)I-dle's third extended play through their official homepage and SNS, which showed the group's promotion schedule beginning March 27 until the release of their album on April 7. The following day, the first official concept trailer for the album was released. The trailer contained the whispering of someone but it was difficult to interpret its meaning. On March 28, the first teaser photo was revealed, and followed with second teaser photo and concept video on March 29. On April 1, Cube launched the (G)I-dle's chic violet exclusive emoji for using hashtags #여자아이들, #GIDLE, #아이들_오마이갓, #GIDLE_OMG and #I_trust. These emojis were effective until April 30, 2020. Subsequently, the group released individual and group jacket album photos. The photos feature the members wearing dark dresses with snake-shaped props and accessories, creating a mysterious and fascinating atmosphere for the True version on April 1, and wearing white dresses with light feathers and flowers to add a pure and light atmosphere for the Lie version on April 2.

The group held an online live media showcase before the song's digital release with Jo Kwon as the MC.

(G)I-dle continue their promotion activities with follow-up song "Luv U" starting April 28, on SBS MTV The Show to repay the love sent from their fans for I Trust. The promotions of the song ended on May 3.

=== Singles ===
"Lion" serves as the album's pre-release single. It was released alongside a music video on October 25, 2019. It peaked at number 5 on the World Digital Song Sales chart, earning (G)I-dle their fifth top 10 hit, while reaching the top twenty in South Korea. (G)I-dle performed "Lion" for the first time in the Queendom final live broadcast on October 31, 2019.

"Oh my god" was released as the album's lead single on April 6, 2020, with the accompanying music video. In South Korea, the song debuted and peaked at number 15 on the Gaon Digital Chart. Moreover, the song attained international success, peaking at number three on Billboard's World Digital Songs chart. "Oh My God" debuted in the charts of several countries, including Hungary, Thailand and Scotland. The song gave (G)I-dle four music show wins.

== Critical reception ==
Professional ratings
Review scores
Source	Rating
IZM	3/5 stars

Writing for IZM, Kim Do-heon described the EP as "it avoids the trap of self-reproduction or boredom through various variations". He continued and praised Soyeon's designing the song by grasping the individuality and the breath of her team members.

Pop music critic Seo Jeong Min-gap included (G)I-dle's I Trust in the list of albums 'If You Don't Listen, You Will Regret It'. Lee Jeong-beom of XSports News included "Luv U" on his list of the "10 K-pop Girl groups' B-Sides that left an impression and helped improve the quality of my life this year". In his article, he wrote that the song expressed a cute side to a strong character and saying "it takes risks to show a side that is not customary for a certain field of creation." He concluded, "The song received high marks for expressing a character that was strong outside but soft inside through a fun, energetic and charming way."

I Trust on critic lists
Critic/Publication	List	Rank	Notes	Ref.
Dazed	The 40 Best K-pop Songs of 2020	18	"Oh My God"	
MTV	Best Kpop B-sides of 2020	15	"Luv U"	
Tonplein	Best Songs of 2020	15	"Oh My God"	
Rolling Stone India	20 Best K-pop Music Videos of 2020	4	Music video	

== Commercial performance ==
According to Hanteo, the album sold 91,311 physical copies on the first day of availability, becoming their fastest and best-selling album to date, demonstrating a growth rate of 495%, and the second-highest (behind Iz*One's Bloom*Iz) first day sales by a girl group on Hanteo. In under three days of its release, the album recorded 100,000 physical copies sold, and later, it topped the album charts in 15 retail stores. I Trust debuted at number one on South Korea's Gaon Album Chart, becoming (G)-I-dle's first number one album in their home country. It is also their first album to have all tracks debut on the Gaon Download Chart.

I Trust debuted at number 7 on the KKBOX Hong Kong Korean Album Weekly Chart. Later, it peaked and charted at number 3 for week 16 and 18 of 2020.

It was reported that I Trust set the highest record for a South Korean girl group to topped iTunes Top Albums chart in 62 countries worldwide. The album also ranked first in the United States on iTunes Pop Album Chart, K-Pop Album Chart, and K-Pop Song Chart. The album scored their best one-week sales with 1,000 copies and a total of 2,000 album-equivalent units in the week ending April 9, debuting at number 4 on Billboard's World Albums Chart.

On May 6, (G)I-dle debuted at Rolling Stone's Top 25 Breakthrough chart as the only K-Pop group to chart for the month of April at the top 20 spot with a unit growth of 3.3 million and over 5.5 million total on demand audio streams in the U.S.

On July 13, it reported that I Trust rank in the Top 20 albums for Gaon's Mid Year Album Sale Chart, with 151,108 album sales. (G)I-dle remains one of two 2018 rookie female groups and only female artists to come from a "non big three" company in the top 20.

== Track listing ==
All lyrics are written by Soyeon; all music is composed and arranged by her and Big Sancho, except where noted.

I Trust track listing
No.	Title	Music	Arrangement	Length
1.	"Oh My God"			3:15
2.	"Luv U" (사랑해)			3:33
3.	"Maybe"	Soyeon; Lee Woo-min 'Collapsedone'	Lee Woo-min 'Collapsedone'	3:00
4.	"Lion"			3:30
5.	"Oh My God" (English version)			3:15
Total length:				16:33

== Personnel ==
- (G)I-dle — vocals (All tracks)
  - Soyeon — production, lyricist (All tracks), composition (All tracks), arrangement (tracks 1, 2, 4, 5)
- Big Sancho — composition (All tracks), arrangement (tracks 1, 2, 4, 5)
- Woomin Lee "collapsedone" — composition (track 3), arrangement (tracks 3)

Additional personnel

- Simon Hong – production
- Lauren Kaori – English translation on "Oh My God" (English Ver.)

== Accolades ==
Awards
Year	Organization	Category	Result	Ref.
2020	NetEase Cloud Music Award	Popular Album of the Year	Won	
2020	NetEase Cloud Music Award	Best Creativity of the Year	Nominated	

== Charts ==
Weekly chart performance for I Trust
Chart (2020)	Peak position
Japanese Albums (Oricon)	48
Polish Albums (ZPAV)	30
Portuguese Albums (AFP)	16
South Korean Albums (Gaon)	1
Spanish Albums (Promusicae)	34
US Top Current Album Sales (Billboard)	81
US World Albums (Billboard)	4

Monthly chart performance for I Trust
Chart (2020)	Peak position
South Korea (Gaon Album Chart)	3

== Certifications and sales ==
Region	Certification	Certified units/sales
South Korea	—	151,108
United States	—	2,000

== Release history ==
Release formats for I Trust
Region	Date	Format	Distributor	Ref.
South Korea	April 6, 2020	Digital download, streaming	Cube; Kakao M	
United States	April 6, 2020	Digital download, streaming	Cube; Republic	
Various	April 6, 2020	Digital download, streaming	Cube; U-Cube; Universal Music	
South Korea	April 7, 2020	CD	Cube; U-Cube; Universal Music	
Japan	April 7, 2020	CD	Cube; U-Cube	

== See also ==
- List of Gaon Album Chart number ones of 2020
- List of K-pop albums on the Billboard charts
