= Oh My God (EP) =

2020 EP by (G)I-dle

- Digital and Type C cover

EP by (G)I-dle
- Released: August 26, 2020
- Recorded: 2020
- Genre: J-pop
- Length: 17:18
- Language: Japanese
- Label: U-Cube; Cube; Universal Music Japan

(G)I-dle chronology
Dumdi Dumdi (2020)	Oh My God (2020)	I Burn (2021)

Alternative cover
- Type B

- Type A

Singles from Oh My God
- 1. "Oh My God (Japanese Ver.)" Released: August 19, 2020

Oh My God (stylized in sentence case) is the second Japanese extended play (fifth overall) by South Korean girl group (G)I-dle. The album was released by Universal Music Japan on August 26, 2020, after a year since Latata released. It contains Japanese versions of previously released singles "Oh My God", "Uh-Oh", "Senorita" and "Dumdi Dumdi" as well as one original Japanese track, "Tung-Tung (Empty)" which was written and composed by member Minnie.

== Background and release ==
Starting June 23, 2020, individual teaser images of the members with the phrase "(G)I-dle 2020.06.29 Mon 6PM" were posted on the group's official Japan Twitter account, without any official clarification of the teaser's content and purpose. On June 29, it was confirmed that (G)I-dle would be releasing their second Japanese extended play, titled Oh My God, on August 26.

On July 10, (G)I-dle released jacket photos of the EP through their website. The photos showed "two sides of front and back", black and red, black and white, which are linked to the concept of "Angels and Devils" presented in the song. Along with the release of the jacket photos, a special site for Oh My God was opened. Pre-orders began on July 14.

== Songs ==
The title song "Oh My God" is a song that mixes emotions of rejection, confusion, cognition, and dignity, and reminds to believe in dear self through conflict with reality. "Uh-Oh" is an expression that comes out of your mouth when you come across a puzzle, and it's a song that people who were completely uninterested at first seemed to pretend to be good friends later. "Senorita" is a bold and provocative song about what to do when you fell in love at first sight. Like the meaning of the word "Tung-Tung" (텅텅, emptiness), it is a emotional song that expresses the feeling of a tired heart which was once full but became empty. Through Minnie's words, "I hope that many people will sympathize with this song because it conveys loneliness." "Dumdi Dumdi" is a song through which (G)I-dle wants to convey "heat", "coolness", "passion", and "heartbeat" that are associated with summer and youth.

== Music video ==
A lyric video of "Oh My God" was released on July 29, 2020.

The music video of the song was released on August 19, 2020, before the release of the EP on August 26, 2020.

== Track listing ==
No.	Title	Lyrics	Music	Arrangement	Length
1.	"Oh My God" (Japanese version)	Soyeon	Soyeon; Yummy Tone	Yummy Tone; Soyeon	3:15
2.	"Uh-Oh" (Japanese version)	Soyeon	Soyeon; June; MooF (153/Joombas)	June; MooF (153/Joombas)	3:27
3.	"Senorita" (Japanese version)	Soyeon	Soyeon; Big Sancho	Soyeon; Big Sancho	3:17
4.	"Tung-Tung (Empty)"	Minnie; FCM Houdini; Soyeon; Mio Jorakuji	Houdini; Minnie	Houdini; Minnie	3:49
5.	"Dumdi Dumdi" (Japanese version)	Soyeon	Soyeon; Pop Time	Pop Time; Soyeon	3:30
Total length:					17:18

Limited Edition Type A (CD＋DVD)
No.	Title	Length
1.	"Oh My God" (Japanese version)
2.	"Uh-Oh" (Japanese version)
3.	"Senorita" (Japanese version)
4.	"Tung-Tung (Empty)"
5.	"Dumdi Dumdi" (Japanese version)
6.	"Oh My God" (Music video; Japanese version)
7.	"Oh My God" (Music video making; Japanese version)

Limited Edition Type B (CD＋PHOTOBOOK 28P)
No.	Title	Length
1.	"Oh My God" (Japanese version)
2.	"Uh-Oh" (Japanese version)
3.	"Senorita" (Japanese version)
4.	"Tung-Tung (Empty)"
5.	"Dumdi Dumdi" (Japanese version)

Regular Edition (CD)
No.	Title	Length
1.	"Oh My God" (Japanese version)
2.	"Uh-Oh" (Japanese version)
3.	"Senorita" (Japanese version)
4.	"Tung-Tung (Empty)"
5.	"Dumdi Dumdi" (Japanese version)

== Charts ==
Chart (2019)	Peak position
Japanese Albums (Oricon)	23
Japan Hot Albums (Billboard Japan)	25

== Certifications and sales ==
Region	Certification	Certified units/sales
Japan	—	4,229

== Release history ==
Region	Date	Format	Distributor
Various	August 26, 2020	Digital download	Cube, Universal Music
Japan	August 26, 2020	Digital download	Cube, Universal Music
Japan	August 26, 2020	CD	Cube, Universal Music
