= Latata (EP) =

2019 EP by (G)I-dle

- Digital cover

EP by (G)I-dle
- Released: July 31, 2019
- Recorded: 2019
- Genre: J-pop
- Language: Japanese
- Label: U-Cube; Cube; Universal Music

(G)I-dle chronology
I Made (2019)	Latata (2019)	I Trust (2020)

Alternative cover
- Type A

- Type B

Singles from Latata
- 1. "Latata (Japanese Ver.)" Released: June 28, 2019

Latata is the debut Japanese-language extended play (third overall) by South Korean girl group (G)I-dle. It was released by Universal Music Japan on July 31, 2019. The EP contains Japanese versions of previously released songs "Latata", "Maze" and "Hann (Alone)", (Note: The Japanese version of Hann (Alone) is only available on iTunes as an exclusive track.) alongside two original Japanese tracks, "Light My Fire" and "For You".

== Background and release ==
On May 19, 2019 it was revealed that (G)I-dle would make their Japanese debut with the EP Latata, with title track "Latata" on July 31, 2019. It was released in three versions: a limited CD+DVD edition (A), a limited CD+PHOTOBOOK 28P edition (B), and a regular CD edition. A Japanese version of "Hann (Alone)" was released exclusively on iTunes as a bonus track.

The song "For You" was written and composed by member Minnie.

== Promotion ==
(G)I-dle held a live showcase at the Mainabi Blitz Akasaka on July 23, 2019. The showcase sold over 1,000 tickets with an attendance of 1,500 people.

== Track listing ==
No.	Title	Lyrics	Music	Arrangement	Length
1.	"Latata" (Japanese version)	Soyeon; Yu Shimoji(Japanese Lyrics)	Soyeon; Big Sancho	Soyeon; Big Sancho	3:23
2.	"Light My Fire"	Yu Shimoji	Hjalmar Wilen; Malin Johansson; Birk Storm	Hjalmar Wilen	3:51
3.	"Maze" (Japanese version)	Son Young-jin; Ferdy; Soyeon; Samuelle Soung(Japanese Lyrics)	Son Young-jin; Ferdy	Son Young-jin; Ferdy	3:20
4.	"For You"	Minnie; FCMHoudini; Soyeon; Eri Osanai(Japanese Lyrics)	Minnie; FCMHoudini	FCMHoudini; Minnie	3:44
Total length:					14:18

iTunes bundle only
No.	Title	Lyrics	Music	Arrangement	Length
5.	"Hann (Alone)" (Japanese version)	Soyeon	Soyeon; Big Sancho	Big Sancho; Soyeon	3:25
Total length:					17:43

Limited Edition Type A (CD＋DVD)
No.	Title	Lyrics	Music	{{{extra_column}}}	Length
1.	"Latata" (Japanese version)	Soyeon; Yu Shimoji(Japanese Lyrics)	Soyeon; Big Sancho	Soyeon; Big Sancho	3:23
2.	"Light My Fire"	Yu Shimoji	Hjalmar Wilen; Malin Johansson; Birk Storm	Hjalmar Wilen	3:51
3.	"Maze" (Japanese version)	Son Young-jin; Ferdy; Soyeon; Samuelle Soung(Japanese Lyrics)	Son Young-jin; Ferdy	Son Young-jin; Ferdy	3:20
4.	"For You"	Minnie; FCMHoudini; Soyeon; Eri Osanai(Japanese Lyrics)	Minnie; FCMHoudini	FCMHoudini; Minnie	3:44
5.	"Latata" (Music video; Japanese version)				3:26
6.	"Latata" (Music video making; Japanese version)
Total length:					14:19

Limited Edition Type B (CD＋PHOTOBOOK 28P)
No.	Title	Length
1.	"Latata" (Japanese version)	3:23
2.	"Light My Fire"	3:51
3.	"Maze" (Japanese version)	3:20
4.	"For You"	3:44
Total length:		14:19

Regular Edition
No.	Title	Length
1.	"Latata" (Japanese version)	3:23
2.	"Light My Fire"	3:51
3.	"Maze" (Japanese version)	3:20
4.	"For You"	3:44
Total length:		14:19

== Charts ==
=== Weekly charts ===
Weekly chart performance for Latata
Chart (2019)	Peak position
Japanese Albums (Oricon)	5
Japan Hot Albums (Billboard Japan)	15
Taiwanese Albums (Five Music)	8

=== Monthly charts ===
Monthly chart performance for Latata
Chart (2019)	Peak position
Japanese Albums (Oricon)	38

== Release history ==
Region	Date	Format	Distributor
Various	July 31, 2019	Digital download	Cube, Universal Music
Japan	July 31, 2019	Digital download	Cube, Universal Music
Japan	July 31, 2019	CD	Cube, Universal Music
