= Lion ((G)I-dle song) =

2019 single by (G)I-dle

"Lion"

Single by (G)I-dle

from the EP Queendom Final Comeback and I Trust
- Released: October 25, 2019
- Genre: Dance-pop
- Length: 3:31
- Label: Cube Entertainment
- Songwriter: Soyeon
- Producers: Soyeon; Big Sancho

(G)I-dle singles chronology
"Put It Straight (Nightmare ver.)" (2019)	"Lion" (2019)	"Oh My God" (2020)

Music video
- "Lion" on YouTube

"Lion" (stylized in all caps) is a song recorded by (G)I-dle, a South Korean girl group who participated in the reality girl group survival show, Queendom. It was released digitally on October 25, 2019, as part of the show's extended play Queendom Final Comeback. Its lyrics were written by Jeon So-yeon, who also composed, produced and arranged the song with Big Sancho. (G)I-dle went on to finish third in show.

Though it did not chart high at the time of its release, it later became a sleeper hit in South Korea after gaining popularity on their stage concept of The Queen's Royal Welcome. It reached a peak at number five on the US World Digital Song Sales chart, giving (G)I-dle their fifth top 10 hit. The song was later included in the group's third EP I Trust, which was released on April 6, 2020.

"Lion" received critical acclaim from music critics, calling it "Song of the Year (Female)" and naming them "young lion". It was also considered "one of the most visceral tracks of 2019" and became one of the group's signature songs. It was chosen by Idology as number one out of 920 songs released in 2019 and was named one of the top 100 K-pop Songs of All Time by Melon and Seoul Shinmun.

== Background and release ==
On October 24, a day before release, Mnet released a preview of the final episode of Queendom which showed the contestants reviewing and describing other teams' songs. The next day, Mnet shared a sneak peek for each track from each group to the viewers. At noon KST, the six contestants including (G)I-dle released their final songs on various music streaming sites.

Before the final episode, Mnet showed a clip of Jeon So-yeon introducing "Lion" and its concept to the members. Soyeon commented, "We don't receive the song, so we have to move quickly." She revealed she received inspiration from live-action The Lion King that was on theaters when she started writing. "A lion is a king, we are kings." The song was released as a digitally on October 25, 2019, through several music portals, including Melon and iTunes, followed by Spotify the next day.

== Composition and lyrics ==
The song is in the key of E minor, 110 bpm with a running time of 3:30 minutes. "Lion" was described as a song that has a strong drum and an impressive 808 bass sound, having lyrics that contain all the fighting, patience, and wounds to occupy and protect a throne by comparing the innate dignity and charisma of a queen to a lion, giving the song a beautiful and strong feeling while being dramatic, sober and cold.

Billboard described it as a fierce, yet lo-fi dance track from the six-woman act to declare their dominance amid a powerful beat and bluesy melodies. The lyrics contain empty spaces for their domineering verses and bold raps to shine in between the chant "queen like a lion" of the chorus.

== Live performances ==
(G)I-dle performed "Lion" for the first time during the final live broadcast of Queendom on October 31, 2019. The stage opens with the set decorated with tall stained glass windows, as an instrumental of organs play, reminiscent of a cathedral. The story of a young girl leading a kingdom's militia through a war, to her coronation as Queen is told through Minnie's narration. This is immediately followed by a solo dance by Shuhua, with the likeness of a grand welcoming ceremony of the queen's return from the battle. The rest of the members walk on stage, adorned in golden robes, decorated ornately with the resemblance of a lion's mane. The choreography is inspired by the movements of a lion and hand gestures that symbolize a crown. After the second chorus, Soyeon has a solo dance amongst the dancers during her rap, declaring "I'm a Queen." The performance finishes with the dancers following the members up a stairwell as they each walk to take a seat upon six thrones positioned at the top of the stage.

The stage was described as "world-class stage" and a "legendary stage". AOA members watching the stage praised the performance, saying, "I felt like I was seeing six lion queens. I was amazed. It was wonderful." Queendom's PD Cho Woori complimented the group for their groundbreaking performance and their solid concept building process for Lion.

On November 1, 2019, the video exceeded one million views at 11 am KST, ranking first as Korea YouTube's fast-growing video, and collected more views than the combined total of views that every other contestants' final stages. The video subsequently surpassed 8.8 million views two weeks later. On November 7, 2019, (G)I-dle performed "Lion" as a special stage on M Countdown.

== Critical reception ==
Popular music critics of Korean web magazine IZM, included "Lion" on their list of 'Top 10 singles that represented 2019' explaining "...in the music world that's rampant with lyrics of love and soulless electronic sound, they showcased the dignity a Queen can have on the stage." The article also mentioned, "There is no reason to skip this song."

Writing for Billboard, L.S praised the song, saying "every part of this anthem is brimming with untamed, frenetic, self-assured power that's channeled into its booming rhythms, more appropriate for a battlefield than a stage". The song was also listed in Idology's lists for best song, best music video, songs with impressive lyrics and best performance in 2019.

Choi Ji-sun, a pop music critic who wrote the book Is Goddess a Compliment? (Korean: 여신은 칭찬일까?) published in January 2021, talks about the music industry limiting idols and especially female ones. (G)I-dle was named as an example of change: (G)I-dle's "Lion" stage on Mnet's Queendom is a representative example. Choi introduced the song as a "rare case of calling a female wild beast" and praised the song and the performance in Queendom. "It was good to see Soyeon's leading creativity and integrating the message and the stage."

"Lion" on critic lists
Critic/Publication	List	Rank	Ref.
Billboard	25 Best K-pop Songs of 2019: Critics' Picks	9	
BuzzFeed	The 30 Best K-pop Music Videos of The Year	28	
Idology	Best Songs of 2019	1	
IZM	Top 10 Singles of 2019	Placed	
L'Officiel Malaysia	14 K-pop Songs That Define 2019	Placed	
Melon	Melon Magazine's Top 7 K-pop songs of 2019	Placed	
Melon	Top 100 K-pop Songs of All Time	49	
SBS PopAsia	Top 100 Asian pop songs of 2019	49	
Tonplein	Top 50 K-pop songs from 2015 to 2019	16	
Rolling Stone India	10 Best K-pop Music Videos of 2019	Placed	

== Commercial performance ==
"Lion" did not enter the Gaon Digital Chart when it was first released, but it debuted at number seventy seven on the Gaon Download Chart. "Lion" gained popularity and went viral after Queendom's final episode aired. It re-entered the real-time charts of various music sites and started the reverse chart. As of December 2019, on the chart issue dated December 2019 the song has received 43,915,024 digital index points on Gaon Digital Chart.

Three weeks after release, "Lion" rose eight spots from the thirteenth to fifth place in the Billboard's World Digital Songs Sales chart. The single also moved up eighty-nine spots on the Gaon Digital Chart, from number 101 to its new peak at number 19. It peaked at number 7 on the Gaon Download Chart. "Lion" peaked at number 2 at KKBox Kpop chart and topped the QQ Music Korean Song chart for two consecutive weeks. The song debuted on the Billboard's K-pop Hot 100 at number 45 and peaked at number 5 on November 9.

== Music video ==
After releasing the track "Lion" on music streaming sites on October 25, (G)I-dle unexpectedly released a music video teaser of the track on November 3. The music video was released on November 4 at midnight KST.

The music video was created by Digipedi and choreographed by Star System who had previously worked with them for "Uh-Oh". Visual effects for Soojin's lion claw scratches were done by students from Hoseo University with guidance from Prof. Cho Hyung-jun. The "Lion" music video starts with Minnie's calm voice and the sound of the low drum in the calm of darkness and tension. IZE Magazine describes the second half of the video as shaking up the gender hierarchy. The members are standing upon the altar while the male lions are at the stairs below them and end with a framed painting of a male lion bathing fire. Soojin standing in front of the portrait with a tattoo "Self-love is the best love," shows that this is liberation based on self-esteem. The narrow framework that was often imposed on mostly girl groups for a certain concept is powerless towards (G)I-dle.

=== Reception ===
Jeff Benjamin, writing for Forbes, described the video as "regal and fierce" in depicting the members in both themes, with members Miyeon, Yuqi and Shuhua in regal settings, sitting on the thrones alongside museum artworks, and members Minnie, Soojin and Soyeon surviving through animalistic settings, claw marks on Soojin's back, Minnie's enclosed by dangerous arrows while Soyeon looking confined but liberated in a cage.

The music video was trending in Korea's YouTube popular videos and topped YouTube's top music video chart for two consecutive weeks. It reached five million views in two days. On November 10, 2019, it has over ten million views since its release. On November 13, 2019, the video exceeded thirteen million views in nine days. The music video debuted at number 41 on November 1–7 Global YouTube Music Videos Chart. In twenty-four days, the music video reached twenty million views. A choreography video was released to commemorate the twenty million views. As of March 9, 2023 it has over 120 million views on YouTube, while its dance practice version has surpassed six million views.

Rolling Stone included (G)I-dle's music video "Lion" in their '10 Best K-pop Music Videos of 2019' and called the video "a victorious celebration of female power" and further praised (G)I-dle's Soyeon involvement in the production, their threatening gazes at the camera "absolutely bold and fearless", choreography and camera works.

== Track listing ==
Digital download / streaming

1. "Lion" – 3:31

== Credits and personnel ==
Credits are adapted from Melon.

- (G)I-dle – vocals
  - Soyeon – producing, songwriting, rap arrangement, record engineering
- Big Sancho – producing, record engineering, piano
- Jeon Hoon – guitar
- Jeon Jae-hee - chorus
- 전 연연 (Cube Studio) – Recording
- Uncle (Cube Studio) – mixed
- Kwon Nam Woo (821 Sound mastering) – mastering

== Accolades ==
Awards and nominations
Year	Organization	Category	Result	Ref.
2020	Golden Disc Awards	Best Female Performance Award	Won	
2020	Korean Music Awards	Best Pop Song	Nominated	

== Charts ==
=== Weekly charts ===
Chart (2019)	Peak position
Singapore (RIAS)	20
South Korea (Gaon)	19
South Korea (K-pop Hot 100)	5
US World Digital Songs (Billboard)	5

=== Monthly charts ===
Chart (2019)	Peak position
South Korea (Gaon Digital Chart)	22

== Plagiarism accusations ==
=== Web novel cover ===
On January 1, 2020, the cover of the web novel "Go Ahead and Be the Supporting Role" was criticized by fans for plagiarizing the concept of (G)I-dle's "Lion" music video. Then, on January 3, 2020, the publishing company Viewcommz released an official statement apologizing to (G)I-dle and their fans. The writer revealed that she uploaded her novel on the web, but the cover of the novel was done by the illustrator. The illustrator then admitted it and modified the painting, and answered, "I don't feel the need to explain because I have made the corrections."

=== Youth With You Season 2 ===
On May 7, 2020, Youth With You Season 2 was criticized for allegedly copying (G)I-dle's "Lion" after Purple Lion's "Lion" stage was uploaded to the Internet. In the performance, the contestant's freeze motions, stage movements, dance, makeup, costume props and stage background are allegedly similar to (G)I-dle's Lion stage on Queendom. A netizen commented, "If dance and these external things are similar, it can also be said that it is a matter of style. If the style is the same, it is difficult not to have similarities. But the strange thing is that the lyrics of "Lion" are too similar", – "Push away the frustrating prejudice / No one could lock me in, not even pain / Who dares to stop and control me, be careful / the lion footprint pace around idle's kingdom" and the lyrics to Purple Lion's "Lion", "Crush all arrogant prejudice / get rid of the boring opinion that frame our narrow minds / there is no one can control your mind anymore it’s your turn to dominate them / the footprint of pride pace along the garden of thorns" However, there was no response from both Cube Entertainment and iQIYI.
