= Tonplein =

South Korean online magazine

- Website type: Online magazine
- Available in: Korean
- Website: tonplein.com
- Launched: 2019
- Current status: Active

Tonplein (Korean: 온음) is a South Korean online magazine that publishes music reviews, articles, and interviews with artists. The magazine founded in March 2019. The webzine often posts articles focusing on reviews of albums and interviews with artists, and the review rating of records is based on a perfect score of 7.
