= I Made =

2019 EP by (G)I-dle

- Digital cover

EP by (G)I-dle
- Released: February 26, 2019
- Recorded: 2018–2019
- Length: 16:51
- Language: Korean; English
- Label: Cube; Kakao

(G)I-dle chronology
I Am (2018)	I Made (2019)	Latata (2019)

Alternative cover
- Physical cover

Singles from I Made
- 1. "Senorita" Released: February 26, 2019; 2. "Put It Straight" Released: October 18, 2019

I Made (stylized in sentence case) is the second extended play by South Korean girl group (G)I-dle. The album was released digitally and physically on February 26, 2019. The album contains five tracks including the lead single, "Senorita", which was composed by member Soyeon and producer Big Sancho.

== Background and release ==
On February 10, 2019, Cube Entertainment announced via SNS that the group would release their second extended play, I Made on February 26, 2019.

On February 11, they released the schedule of promotion for the album. On February 13, the EP's track listing was unveiled, revealing the lead single to be titled "Senorita" among four other tracks. Member Minnie participated in composing for the first time.

On February 20, an audio snippet was released, followed by music video teasers for "Senorita".

The EP was released on February 26 through several music portals in South Korea, while the physical album was released the following day.

== Composition ==
I Made is sixteen minutes long, consisting of five tracks. Features Latin music, dance-pop, ballad, dark R&B and EDM genres. The album title refers to the involvement of the members in production. Member Soyeon composed four tracks, arranged three, and wrote lyrics for all five; member Minnie composed and produced the closing track. The opening track "Senorita" is the lead single. It is a Latina and dance-pop track that recalls "a retro feel in a trendy way" in its production. Its incorporates castanets, jazzy brass horns alongside groovy rhythmic strings and sleek electronic effects. It also features bass guitar, drums, percussion, piano and brass instruments that "heavily harmonized and reminiscent of "flamenco music". Its lyrics talk about a girl falling in love with a guy at the first sight. The girl confidently relaying their emotions to a "Senor," who seemingly chants out the song's title in the post-chorus. Second track "What's Your Name", is an EDM song that incorporate saxophone leads, and an "emotional" chord progression in its intro. Third track "put it straight", was described as ballad, R&B track. Fourth track "Give Me Your" is a "jazz-style" song, characterised by bouncing rhythm, guitar riff, piano and the 8-bit bounce sounds with lyrics convey "a cute confession send to the person you love." The closing track "Blow You Mind" was described as soul–trap R&B genre.

== Promotion ==
Ahead of their comeback, cube released a special photo card which only can be purchased at 20Space.

(G)I-dle held a live showcase at Blue Square Samsung Card Hall in Hannam-dong, Seoul before the release of the EP on February 26, where they performed "Senorita" along with "Blow Your Mind". On the same day, they had a live broadcast on Naver V Live to celebrate their comeback with fans.

The group started promoting "Senorita" on February 27 on MBC Music Show Champion.

== Music video ==
Before the last episode of To Neverland, (G)I-dle release a self-directed music video for Minnie composed song "Blow Your Mind" on February 19. The music video was released through M2 channel.

On February 26, "Senorita" was released along with its music video. The music video surpassed five million views within 21 hours of its release.

== Track listing ==
No.	Title	Lyrics	Music	Arrangement	Length
1.	"Senorita"	Soyeon	Soyeon; Big Sancho	Big Sancho; Soyeon	3:17
2.	"What's Your Name"	Soyeon	Soyeon; Lee Woo-min	Lee Woo-min	3:09
3.	"Put It Straight" (싫다고 말해)	Soyeon	Soyeon	HouDini; Soyeon	3:56
4.	"Give Me Your" (주세요)	Soyeon	Soyeon; HouDini	HouDini; Soyeon	3:40
5.	"Blow Your Mind"	Minnie; FlowBlow; Soyeon	Minnie; FlowBlow	FlowBlow; Minnie	2:49
Total length:					16:51

== Charts ==
=== Weekly charts ===
Chart (2019)	Peak position
South Korean Albums (Gaon)	2
Taiwanese Albums (Five Music)	1
US World Album (Billboard)	5

=== Monthly chart ===
Chart (2018)	Peak position
South Korean Albums (Gaon)	10

=== Year-end charts ===
Chart (2019)	Peak position
South Korean Albums (Gaon)	62

== Sales ==
Region	Sales
South Korea	34,104

== Release history ==
Region	Date	Format	Distributor
Various	February 26, 2019	Digital download, streaming	Cube Entertainment; Kakao
South Korea	February 26, 2019	Digital download, streaming	Cube Entertainment; Kakao
South Korea	February 26, 2019	CD	Cube Entertainment; Kakao
