= Senorita ((G)I-dle song) =

"Senorita"

Single by (G)I-dle

from the EP I Made
- Released: February 26, 2019
- Recorded: Cube Studio
- Genre: Latin; dance-pop
- Length: 3:17
- Label: Cube; Kakao
- Songwriter: Soyeon
- Producers: Soyeon; Big Sancho

(G)I-dle singles chronology
"Pop/Stars" (2018)	"Senorita" (2019)	"Uh-Oh" (2019)

Music video
- "Senorita" on YouTube

"Senorita" is a song recorded by South Korean girl group (G)I-dle. It was released on February 26, 2019, as the title track from the group's second EP I Made (2019).

A Japanese version of the song was released on August 26, 2020, for their 2nd Japanese EP Oh My God. The song was rerecorded without group member Soojin, who was removed from (G)I-dle in 2021, for the 2025 EP We Are I-dle.

== Background ==
Soyeon, the leader and main songwriter for (G)I-dle, worked with Carlos Gorito, a Brazilian TV personality based in South Korea, to express the Spanish part of the song in an effective way.

== Composition ==
The lyrics were written by member Soyeon, who also served as producer alongside Big Sancho. "Senorita" is a Latina and dance-pop track that recalls "a retro feel in a trendy way" in its production. Its incorporates castanets, jazzy brass horns alongside groovy rhythmic strings and sleek electronic effects. It also features bass guitar, drums, percussion, piano and brass instruments that "heavily harmonized and reminiscent of "flamenco music". In terms of musical notation, the song was written in the key of C minor with a tempo of 120 beats per minute. Its lyrics talk about a girl falling in love with a guy at the first sight. The girl confidently relaying their emotions to a "Senor", who seemingly chants out the song's title in the post-chorus.

== Music video ==
On February 26, "Senorita" was released along with its music video. The video shows the group entering a brightly-hued hotel full of danger, including razor blade-filled lollipops, dangling cranes, electrocution via hairdryer, and fires. The video's release marks the partnership with Memebox's new Kaja cosmetic line. Throughout, the members of the act wear and interact with Kaja makeup products.

Park Dong-seon of Electronic Times noted that the music video concept is reminiscing to a 80s – 90s musical movie, writing "the song's trendy retro, that is [giving a] 'New-Retro' feeling, and the vivid color sense in the groovy choreography performance create a fascinating feeling".

== Promotion ==
The group performed the song for the first time on February 27, 2019 on MBC's Show Champion. Followed by Music Bank on March 1. On March 2, they performed on Show! Music Core. On the next day they performed on Inkigayo. On March 5, they appeared on The Show, and on March 7, they performed on M Countdown. The promotion continued for three more weeks, repeating their performances on these six South Korean music shows.

== Critical reception ==
"Senorita" on critic lists
Critic/Publication	List	Rank	Ref.
Amazer	Most Covered K-pop Songs of 2019	7	
Bugs	2019 Year End Top 100	98	

== Commercial performance ==
"Senorita" debuted at number 7 on the US World Digital Song Sales chart with 1,000 downloads and 782,000 streams in the week ending February 28. This was the group's fourth entry on the chart and the third as a group alone. The song debuted at number 30 on the Gaon Digital Chart and peaked at number 19 the following week. "Senorita" debuted at number 26 on Billboard Korea's Kpop Hot 100 and peaked at number 10 the following week.

== Accolades ==
Awards
Year	Organization	Award	Result	Ref.
2019	Mnet Asian Music Awards	Song of the Year	Nominated	
2019	Mnet Asian Music Awards	Best Dance Performance – Female Group	Nominated	
2020	Gaon Chart Music Awards	Song of the Year – February	Nominated	

Music programs awards
Program	Date	Ref.
Show Champion (MBC Music)	March 6, 2019	

== Charts ==
=== Weekly charts ===
Chart (2018)	Peak position
Singapore (RIAS)	20
South Korea (Gaon Digital Chart)	19
South Korea (Kpop Hot 100)	10
US World Digital Song Sales (Billboard)	7

=== Monthly chart ===
Chart (2019)	Peak position
South Korea (Gaon Digital Chart)	27

=== Year-end charts ===
Chart (2019)	Peak position
South Korea (Gaon Digital Chart)	181

== Release history ==
Release history for "Senorita"
Region	Date	Format	Label	Ref.
Various	February 26, 2019	Digital download; streaming	Cube; Kakao	
