= Uh-Oh (song) =

2019 single by (G)I-dle

Single by (G)I-dle
- Released: June 26, 2019
- Studio: Cube Studio
- Genre: Boom bap
- Length: 3:28
- Label: Cube Entertainment
- Songwriter: Soyeon
- Producers: Soyeon; June; MooF (153/Joombas)

(G)I-dle singles chronology
"Senorita" (2019)	"Uh-Oh" (2019)	"Put It Straight (Nightmare ver.)" (2019)

Music video
- "Uh-Oh" on YouTube

Professional ratings
Review scores
Source	Rating
IZM	3.5/5 stars

"Uh-Oh" is a song recorded by South Korean girl group (G)I-dle. It was released on June 26, 2019, by Cube Entertainment as their second digital single.

A Japanese version of the song was released on August 26, 2020, for their 2nd Japanese EP Oh My God.

== Background and release ==
On June 16, 2019, it was released that (G)I-dle will have their comeback with digital single "Uh-Oh". Teaser photos were released on June 17 and June 18. Music video teasers were released for each member, Yuqi and Minnie on June 21, Soojin and Shuhua on June 22 and Soyeon and Miyeon on June 23. The group teaser was released on June 24 and 25. In an interview with Vibe magazine, the group's leader and composer, Soyeon mention that "Uh-Oh" was written before the release of "Senorita". She wrote it to tell off the people who did not believe she could become a singer or an idol.

The song was released as a digital single on June 26, 2019, through several music portals, including MelOn, iTunes and Spotify.

== Promotion ==
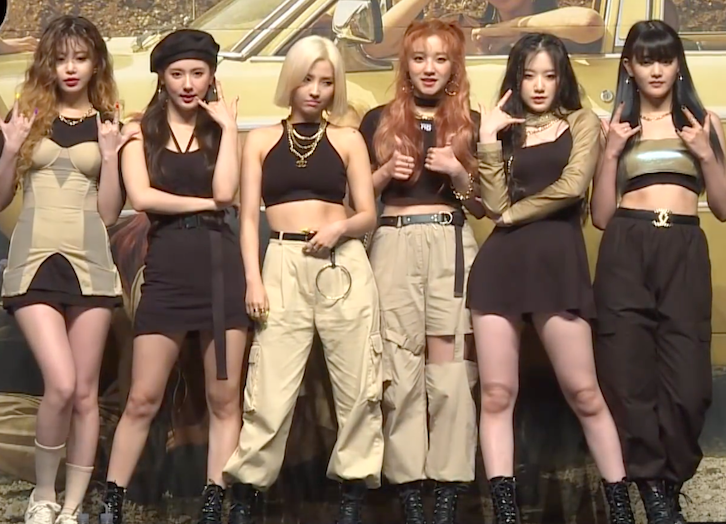
(G)I-DLE at 'Uh-Oh' Showcase in June 2019

(G)I-dle appeared on MBC Every 1's Weekly Idol on June 26. "Uh-Oh" had its debut showcase on the day of the released, in Blue Square Amusement Hall.

(G)I-dle made their comeback stage starting June 26, 2019 through the music program The Show, Show Champion, M Countdown, Music Bank and continued promoting the single on Inkigayo. (G)I-dle were featured in Sunday Times UK article about things currently heating up and trending around the world during first week of July.

== Composition ==
"Uh-Oh" is composed in the key of B minor, with a tempo of 92 BPM. The song was written by member Soyeon, who co-produced the song with June and MooF (153/Joombas). The song was described as a "Boom bap" style. "Boom bap" is a music production style that was prominent in East Coast hip hop music during the 1990s. The term "boom bap" represents the sounds used for the bass and snare drum.

== Commercial performance ==
"Uh-Oh" ranked top fifty at number 22 on NetEase Cloud Music China for the first half of 2019 making them the only Kpop group to chart.

== Music video ==
"Uh-Oh" – Full music video

On June 26, "Uh-Oh" was released along with its music video. The music video for was choreographed by Star System, while being directed by Digipedi. Tamar Herman of Billboard describe the music video for "Uh Oh" as to show off the confident side of the six women, as each verse serves up a powerful clapback at naysayers. Drawing on '90s fashion for inspiration, the members of (G)I-dle assert themselves and their independence in a variety of settings, ranging from auto body shops to the desert to a club, where they end things by chanting declarations of their own perfection and their love for their fans. Hanan Haddad of E! News stated that the video also featured the members styled as '90s hip-hop baddies, complete with gold chains and denim-on-denim ensembles. The choreography also reflects the rebellious vibe of the song with many powerful moves accompanied with tough expressions. The music video has exceeded 5 million views on YouTube at 6:00 pm on June 27.

== Usage in media ==
"Uh-Oh" was featured in episode 85, Amazing Saturday DoReMi Market segment on November 30.

== Credits and personnel ==
Credits adapted from melon.

Personnel

- (G)I-dle – vocals
  - Soyeon – lyricist, composer, chorus
- June – composer, arranger, synthesizer, bass
- MooF (153/Joombas) – Composer, arranger, piano, string
- Jeon Jeon-yeon – recording engineer, chorus
- Uncle Jo – mixing engineer

== Accolades ==
Year-end lists
Critic/Publication	List	Rank	Ref.
Douban	Most Popular Korean Songs in 2019	3	
Medium	20 Best K-Pop Songs of 2019	14	
Spotify	Top K-Pop Artists of 2019	12	

Music program award
Program	Date	Ref.
The Show (SBS MTV)	July 2, 2019	

== Charts ==
=== Weekly charts ===
Chart (2019)	Peak position
Singapore (RIAS)	23
South Korea (Gaon)	31
South Korea (K-pop Hot 100)	23
US World Digital Song Sales (Billboard)	7

=== Monthly chart ===
Chart (2019)	Peak position
South Korea (Gaon Digital Chart)	41

== Certifications ==
Region	Certification	Certified units/sales
Brazil (Pro-Música Brasil)	Gold	20,000^{‡}
^{‡} Sales+streaming figures based on certification alone.

== Release history ==
Region	Date	Format	Label
Various	June 26, 2019	Digital download, streaming	Cube Entertainment; Kakao M
South Korea	June 26, 2019	Digital download, streaming	Cube Entertainment; Kakao M
