= Latata =

- Japanese cover

Single by (G)I-dle

from the EP I Am
- Released: May 2, 2018
- Genre: Trap-pop; moombahton; reggae
- Length: 3:22
- Label: Cube Entertainment; Kakao M
- Songwriter: Soyeon
- Producers: Soyeon; Big Sancho

(G)I-dle singles chronology
"Latata" (2018)	"Hann (Alone)" (2018)

Music video
- "Latata" on YouTube

Professional ratings
Review scores
Source	Rating
IZM	3/5 stars

"Latata" (stylized in all caps) is the debut single recorded by South Korean girl group (G)I-dle as the lead single from their debut Korean extended play (EP) I Am. It was released on May 2, 2018, by Cube Entertainment and distributed by Kakao M. It was written by member Soyeon, who also produced the song alongside Big Sancho. A music video for the song was also released on the same day. Promotions for the song resulted in (G)I-dle's first music show win on SBS MTV's The Show on May 22, 2018. The song also resulted in a second win on Mnet's M Countdown.

A Japanese version was released on July 12, 2019 as the lead single from their Japanese debut EP of the same name. An English version was released on May 15, 2020. (Note: English translation by Lauren Kaori)

== Composition ==
"Latata" described as a Moombahton, trap song, featuring reggae rhythm. It was composed in the key of A Minor with a tempo of 98 beats per minute. Lyrically, it is about a woman in love, who expresses her desire to dance with her lover. In an interview with MBC's Radio Star, Soyeon stated that "Latata's" chorus was a word-play on Song Joon-geun's catchphrase, she furthermore explained, "I was impressed with 'Ratata Arata', which was popularized by Song Jun-geun's character 'Gonzalez' from "Bongsunga School". After that, while listening to Latin music, the word 'Ratata Arata' came to mind, and that's how Latata was created".

== Promotion ==
The group started promoting their title track "Latata" on May 3. They first performed the lead single on Mnet's M Countdown, followed by performances on KBS' Music Bank, MBC's Show! Music Core and SBS's Inkigayo. They received their first-ever music show win since debut on May 22, 2018 on SBS MTV's The Show. Two days later, on May 24, the group received their second music show win for "Latata" on M Countdown.

== Commercial performance ==
"Latata" did not enter the Gaon Digital Chart in its first week, but did enter the component Download Chart at number 68. In its second week, the song debuted at number 35 on the Gaon Digital Chart as a "hot" song and peaked at number 16 two weeks later. The song entered at number 4 on the Gaon Social Chart, and climbed to number 3 the following week.

In the United States, the song entered at number 11 on the Billboard World Digital Songs chart, and climbed to number 4 the following week, selling 1,000 copies, making it the best-selling K-pop song in the week of May 10. The song has sold 3,000 copies in America as of August 2018.

In September 2020, "Latata" music video surpassed 160 million combined views for the official music video uploaded on 1theK's channel and (G)I-dle's official channel. On June 27, 2022 the music video surpassed 200 million views for the official music video uploaded on 1theK's channel.

== Accolades ==
Year-end lists for "Latata"
Critic/Publication	Year	List	Rank	Ref.
Bugs!	2018	2018 Year End Top 100	37	
Deezer	2022	K-POP 2022 Hits	Placed	
Idology	2018	2018 Songs of the Year	1	
Paper	2018	Top 20 K-Pop Songs of 2018	14	
SBS PopAsia	2018	Top 100 Asian pop songs of 2018	38	

Music program wins
Program	Date (3 total)	Ref.
The Show	May 22, 2018	
The Show	May 29, 2018	
M Countdown	May 24, 2018	

== Charts ==
=== Weekly charts ===
Chart (2018)	Peak position
South Korea (Gaon)	12
South Korea (K-pop Hot 100)	12
US World Digital Songs (Billboard)	4

=== Monthly chart ===
Chart (2018)	Peak position
South Korea (Gaon)	13

=== Year-end chart ===
Chart (2018)	Peak position
South Korea (Gaon)	81

== Release history ==
Release history for "Latata"
Region	Date	Format	Version	Label	Ref
South Korea	May 2, 2018	Digital download; streaming	Original	Cube; Kakao	
Various	May 2, 2018	Digital download; streaming	Original	Cube; Kakao	
Japan	July 19,2019	Digital download; streaming	Japanese	U-Cube; Cube; Universal Music Japan	
Various	July 19,2019	Digital download; streaming	Japanese	U-Cube; Cube; Universal Music Japan	
Various	May 15, 2020	Digital download; streaming	English	U-Cube; Cube; Universal Music	

== See also ==
- List of M Countdown Chart winners (2018)
