= Hann (Alone) =

2018 single by (G)I-dle

Single by (G)I-dle
- Released: August 14, 2018
- Studio: Cube Studio
- Genre: House; dance-pop
- Length: 3:25
- Label: Cube
- Songwriter: Soyeon
- Producers: Big Sancho; Soyeon

(G)I-dle singles chronology
"Latata" (2018)	"Hann (Alone)" (2018)	"Pop/Stars" (2018)

Music video
- "한(一)(HANN(Alone))" on YouTube

Professional ratings
Review scores
Source	Rating
The 405	8/10

"Hann (Alone)" (Korean: 한(一); stylized as "HANN (Alone)") is a song recorded by South Korean girl group (G)I-dle. It was released on August 14, 2018, by Cube Entertainment as a digital single. A music video for the song was also released on August 14.

== Composition ==
The song was written by member Soyeon, who co-produced the song with Big Sancho. Billboard described the song as a "creeping" dance-pop song built on sleek strings, echoing harmonies and vibrant, tinny percussion. The lyrics talk about trying to forget a past lover.

== Release ==
The song was released as a digital single on August 14, 2018, through several music portals, including MelOn and iTunes.

== Commercial performance ==
"Hann (Alone)" debuted at number 14 on the Gaon Digital Chart on the week ending August 18 and peaked at number 8 the following week. It also debuted at number 20 on Billboard Korea's K-pop Hot 100 on the week ending August 19 and peaked at number 10 in its fourth week. It also debuted at number 2 on the US Billboard World Digital Songs, with more than 1,000 copies sold and hitting a new peak on the chart. The song placed at number 23 for the month of August 2018.

== Music video ==
The music video was released simultaneously with the single on August 14. Within 12 hours, the video surpassed 2 million views on YouTube. On August 22, 2019, it has reached 100 million views on YouTube. Making this (G)I-dle's second music video to reach a 100 million views. The scene when Soyeon tamed a scorpion was listed at #10 on Refinery29 K-Pop's Fiercest Music Video Moments of 2018.

== Accolades ==
"Hann (Alone)" ranked at number 77 on Bugs 2018 Year End Top 100 and number 3 on Dazed's 20 Best K-pop songs of 2018 list. It was also named one of the best K-pop songs of 2018 by Idolator (number 10) and The Young Folks (number 20).

Music programs awards
Program	Date	Ref.
Show Champion	August 29, 2018	
The Show	September 4, 2018	
M Countdown	September 6, 2018	

== Credits and personnel ==
Credits are adapted from Melon.

- (G)I-dle – vocals
  - Soyeon – producing, songwriting, arranger, organ
  - Minnie – whistle
- Big Sancho – producing, arranger, piano, synthesizer
- Jeon Jae-hee – chorus
- Jeon Yeon (Cube Studio) – record engineering, Recording
- Mr. Cho (Cube Studio) – mixed
- Kwon Nam-woo (821 Sound mastering) – mastering

== Charts ==
=== Weekly charts ===
Chart (2018)	Peak position
New Zealand Hot Singles (RMNZ)	39
Singapore (RIAS)	24
South Korea (Gaon Digital Chart)	8
South Korea (K-pop Hot 100)	10
US World Digital Song Sales (Billboard)	2

=== Monthly chart ===
Chart (2018)	Peak position
South Korea (Gaon Digital Chart)	12

== See also ==
- List of M Countdown Chart winners (2018)
