= List of I-dle live performances =

I-dle live performances
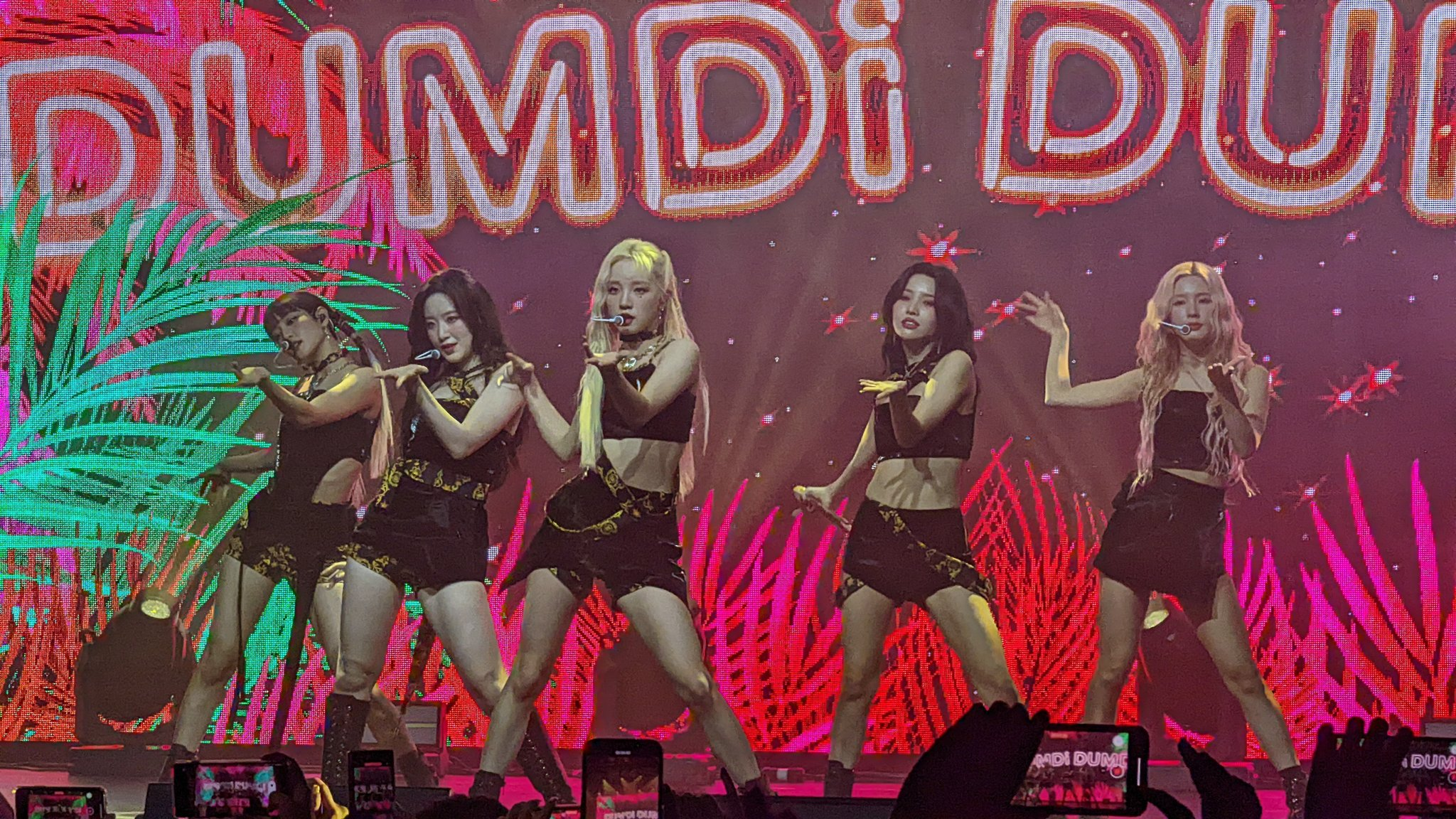
- (G)I-dle performing "Dumdi Dumdi" at Just Me ( )I-dle World Tour in 2022
- Concert tours: 5
- One-off concerts: 2
- Fan meetings: 4
- Showcases: 8
- Music festivals: 49

The following is a list of South Korean girl group I-dle's live performances and concert tours. The group has completed three world tours and performed in Asia, North America, South America, Europe and Oceania.

== Tours ==
Title	Dates	Associated album(s)	Continent(s)	Shows	Ref.
Just Me ( )I-dle World Tour	June 17, 2022 – October 1, 2022	I Never Die	Asia; North America; South America	21	
I Am Free-Ty World Tour	June 17, 2023 – October 29, 2023	I Feel	Asia; North America; Europe	23	
I-dol World Tour	August 3, 2024 – November 2, 2024	2 I Sway	Asia; North America; Oceania	22	
I-dle First Japan Tour	October 4, 2025 – October 19, 2025	I-dle	Asia	4	
Syncopation World Tour	February 21, 2026 – present	We Are	Asia; North America; Oceania	21	

== Concerts ==
Title	Date	City	Venue	Attendance	Performed songs	Ref.
I-Land: Who Am I (Note: This event was streamed live online due to concerns over the COVID-19 pandemic.)	July 5, 2020	Seoul	Cube TV	11,000	—	
For Neverland (Note: The concert is produced by Pico, a global VR company, in collaboration with Korea's leading AI-based metabus content art tech company Viv Studio, 'For Neverland' is K-pop's first interactive VR concert and can be seen exclusively through Pico video. This concert consists of a total of 65 minutes, including a 60-minute main film and a 5-minute making video. The concert is in 4K resolution through a 360-degree viewing angle that combines a 180-degree live-action film and a 180-degree interactive zone. It is possible to interact by pressing facial emoticons with a headset or shaking a cheering rod with a controller, and a free viewing mode is possible by selecting the zoom-in/zoom-out screen.)	December 31, 2022	Worldwide		–	"Nxde"; "Senorita"; "Latata"; "Dumdi Dumdi"; "Hwaa"; "Oh My God"; "My Bag"; "Never Stop Me"; "Uh-Oh"; "Tomboy"	

== Fan meetings ==
Title	Date	City	Venue	Attendance	Performed songs	Ref.
Welcome to the Neverland	September 22, 2019	Seoul	Blue Square YES24 Live Hall	–	"Blow Your Mind"; "Latata"; "Relay"; "Hello Bitches" + "Mic Drop" + "Crazy" (by CL, BTS, 4Minute); "Uh-Oh"; "All That Jazz" (Chicago cover); "Maze"; "Hann (Alone)"; "Put It Straight"	
GBC in the Neverland [(G)I-dle Broadcast Club]	November 8, 2020	Worldwide		–	"What's Your Name"; "Pop/Stars" (K/DA); "Help Me"; "Dumdi Dumdi"; "For You" (Korean ver.); "Latata" (Debut ver.); "I'm the Trend"; "Luv U"	
Universe Fan Party – School Fest. in Neverland	May 21, 2022	Seoul	YES24 Live Hall	–	"Latata"; "Oh My God"; "My Bag"; "Tomboy"	
Letter of Fortune <DEAR. NƎVƎRLAND>	January 28 – 29, 2023	Seoul	SK Olympic Handball Gymnasium	6,000	"Nxde"; "Latata"; "Abracadabra" (Brown Eyed Girls); "Reset"; "Never Stop Me"; "Tomboy"; "Love" (Day 1) / "What's in Your House?" (Day 2); "Escape"; "Poloroid"	

== Showcases ==
Event	Date	City	Venue	Attendance	Ref.
Debut and I Am showcase	May 2, 2018	Seoul	Blue Square iMarket Hall	—N/a	
I Made showcase	February 26, 2019	Seoul	Blue Square iMarket Hall	—N/a	
Uh-Oh showcase	June 26, 2019	Seoul	Blue Square iMarket Hall	—N/a	
Latata showcase	July 23, 2019	Tokyo	Mainabi Blitz Akasaka	1,500	
I Trust media online showcase	April 6, 2020	Seoul	—N/a	—N/a	
Dumdi Dumdi media online showcase	August 3, 2020	Seoul	—N/a	—N/a	
I Burn online media showcase	January 11, 2021	Seoul	—N/a	—N/a	
I Never Die media showcase	March 14, 2022	Seoul	—N/a	—N/a	
X-Love Show Private Premiere	October 17, 2022	Seoul	CGV Cheongdam Cine City	112	

== Joint tours and concerts ==
Event	Date	City	Country	Venue	Performed song(s)	Ref.
United Cube Concert – One	June 16, 2018	Seoul	South Korea	Korea International Exhibition Center	"Maze"; "Latata"	
KBS Open Concert	June 19, 2018	Seoul	South Korea	KBS Hall	"Latata"	
M Countdown in Taipei	July 5, 2018	Taipei	Taiwan	Taipei Arena	"Fake Love" (BTS); "Latata"	
KBS Open Concert	August 30, 2018	Seoul	South Korea	KBS Hall	"Hann (Alone)"	
INK Incheon K-Pop Concert	September 1, 2018	Incheon	South Korea	Incheon Munhak Stadium	"Hann (Alone)"	
Music Bank World Tour in Berlin	September 15, 2018	Berlin	Germany	Max-Schmeling-Halle	"Sunny" (Boney M.) ft Daniel Lindemann; "Latata"; "Hann (Alone)"	
2018 KCON in Thailand	September 30, 2018	Bangkok	Thailand	IMPACT Arena	"Brand New" (Shinhwa); "Hann (Alone)"	
POSCO concert – Blooming Dreams	November 24, 2018	Seoul	South Korea	POSCO Center	"Maze"; "Light My Body Up" (David Guetta); "Latata"	
MBN Hero Concert	November 23, 2018	Seoul	South Korea	Jamsil Arena	"Latata"; "Hann (Alone)"	
2019 Hope Sharing 1m 1Won Charity Walk	April 6, 2019	Suwon	South Korea	Gwanggyo Lake Park	"Hann (Alone)"; "Latata"; "Maze"; "Senorita"	
2019 Let's Walk Together Incheon Festa	April 20, 2019	Incheon	South Korea	Incheon Grand Park	"Hann (Alone)"; "Latata"; "Maze"; "Senorita"	
SBS funE 2019 ONE K Concert	March 1, 2019	Seoul	South Korea	Korea National Assembly Proceeding Hall	"Senorita"	
KBS Open Concert	March 5, 2019	Seoul	South Korea	KBS Hall	"Senorita"; "Latata"	
U & Cube Festival 2019 in Japan	March 23, 2019	Tokyo	Japan	Musashino Forest Sport Plaza	"Hann (Alone)"; "Latata"; "Give Me Your"; "Senorita"	
2019 Dream Concert	May 18, 2019	Seoul	South Korea	Seoul World Cup Stadium	"Senorita"	
KCON in NY	July 7, 2019	New York	United States	Madison Square Garden	"Uh-Oh"; "Hann (Alone)"; "Latata"; "Senorita"; "All That Jazz" (Chicago)	
2019 KCON in Thailand	September 29, 2019	Bangkok	Thailand	IMPACT Arena	"$$$" + "Runner's High" (Note: Performed by Soyeon) (3Racha); "Uh-Uh"; "Hann (Alone)"; "Latata"; "Senorita	
2019 Pepsi Concert #FortheLoveofIt	November 24, 2019	Seoul	South Korea	Jamsil Students' Gymnasium	"Uh-Oh"; "Senorita"; "Latata"	
KCON:TACT 2020 Summer	June 23, 2020	Seoul	South Korea	Mnet studio	"Oh My God"; "Latata"; "Luv U"; "Lion"	
SBS Super Concert-2020 Super On:Tact	October 18, 2020	—	South Korea	—	"Dumdi Dumdi"; "Uh-Uh"; "Senorita"; "Hann (Alone)"; "Latata"	
2020 MBC Live in DMZ (Note: The event was held with a minimal number of people due to the ongoing COVID-19.)	October 23, 2020	Goyang	South Korea	Goyang Stadium	"Dumdi Dumdi"	
KITE: K-Pop in the Emirates	November 13, 2020	—	South Korea	—	"Dumdi Dumdi"; "Latata"	
UNI-KON	February 14, 2021	—	South Korea	—	"Lion"; "Dumdi Dumdi"; "Hwaa"	
Expo 2020	January 16, 2022	Dubai	United Arab Emirates	Jubilee Park	"Oh My God"; "Hwaa"; "Dumdi Dumdi"; "Latata"	
Music Bank World Tour in Chile	November 12, 2022	Santiago	Chile	Estadio Monumental David Arellano	"Nxde"; "Tomboy"; "Latata" (Note: The performance was cancelled halfway through the event due to dangerous weather conditions.)	

== Music festivals ==
Event	Date	City	Country	Venue	Performed song(s)	Ref.
MBC DMC Festival 2018 – Korean Music Wave	September 8, 2018	Seoul	South Korea	Digital Media City	"Hot Issue" (4Minute); "Hann (Alone)"	
SBS (Sookmyung Broadcasting System) 43rd Film Festival	October 2, 2018	Seoul	South Korea	Sookmyung Women's University	"Light My Body Up" (David Guetta); "Hann (Alone)"; "Latata"; "Maze"	
Go Beyond 100 Festival	October 5, 2018	Seoul	South Korea	Chung-Ang University	"Light My Body Up" (David Guetta); "Hann (Alone)"; "Latata"; "Maze"	
JTBC 2018 Gangnam Festival K-Pop Concert	October 6, 2018	Seoul	South Korea	Starfield COEX Mall	"Latata"; "Hann (Alone)"	
2018 Busan One Asia Festival (BOF)	October 20, 2018	Busan	South Korea	Busan Asiad Main Stadium	"Hann (Alone)"	
SBS funE 2018 Jeju Hallyu Festival	November 4, 2018	Jeju	South Korea	Jeju Stadium	"Hann (Alone)"	
70th Sapporo Snow Festival "11th K-Pop Festival 2019"	February 9, 2019	Sapporo	Japan	Sapporo Cultural Arts Theater Hitaru	"Latata"; "Maze"; "Light My Body Up" (David Guetta); "Hann (Alone)"	
2019 Soldier Youth Festival	April 21, 2019	Suwon	South Korea	Seodong Life Park	"Hann (Alone)"; "Latata"; "Maze"; "Senorita"	
2019 Uiwang Railway Festival	May 5, 2019	Seoul	South Korea	Wangsong lake	"Senorita"; "Hann (Alone)"; "Maze"; "Latata"	
89th Chunhyang Festival	May 8, 2019	Namwon	South Korea	Gwanghalluwon Garden	"Senorita"; "Latata"	
56th Jeollabuk-do People's Sports Festival	May 10, 2019	Gochang County	South Korea	Gochang Public Stadium	"Senorita"; "Hann (Alone)"; "Latata"	
2019 KAIST Spring Festival	May 14, 2019	Daejeon	South Korea	KAIST	"Senorita"; "Hann (Alone)"; "Maze"; "Latata"	
2019 Dankook University Festival	May 15, 2019	Seoul	South Korea	Dankook University	"Senorita"; "Hann (Alone)"; "Maze"; "Latata"	
2019 Tongwon University Festival	May 16, 2019	Seoul	South Korea	Tongwon University	"Senorita"; "Hann (Alone)"; "Maze"; "Latata"	
2019 Kwangwoon University Festival	May 17, 2019	Seoul	South Korea	Kwangwoon University	"Senorita"; "Hann (Alone)"; "Maze"; "Latata"	
2019 Sogang University Festival	May 17, 2019	Seoul	South Korea	Sogang University	"Senorita"; "Hann (Alone)"; "Maze"; "Latata"	
23rd Dong-Ah Institute of Media and Arts Festival	May 22, 2019	Seoul	South Korea	Dong-ah Institute of Media and Arts	"Senorita"; "Hann (Alone)"; "Maze"; "Latata"	
KU:KEY Festival	May 23, 2019	Seoul	South Korea	Korea University	"Senorita"; "Hann (Alone)"; "Maze"; "Latata"	
2019 HallyuPopFest	May 26, 2019	Kallang	Singapore	Singapore Indoor Stadium	"Senorita"; "Hann (Alone)"; "Latata"	
Daejin in Wonderland Festival	May 28, 2019	Pocheon	South Korea	Daejin University	"Senorita"; "Hann (Alone)"; "Maze"; "Latata"	
10th Annual Children's Diabetes Celebration Festival	June 8, 2019	Seoul	South Korea	Lotte World Undersea Kingdom	"Senorita"; "Hann (Alone)"; "Maze"; "Latata"	
2019 Dankook University Spring Festival	May 15, 2019	Seoul	South Korea	Dankook University	"Senorita"; "Hann (Alone)"; "Maze"; "Latata"	
2019 K-Pop Artist Festival	June 15, 2019	Seoul	South Korea	Seoul Land	"Senorita"; "Hann (Alone)"; "Maze"; "Latata"	
2019 K-World Festa Closing Ceremony	August 24, 2019	Seoul	South Korea	Olympic Gymnastics Arena	"Senorita"; "Latata"	
Picnic: Engineering School Flavored Festival	September 19, 2019	Seoul	South Korea	Seoul National University	"Uh-Oh"; "Senorita"; "Hann (Alone)"; "Latata"	
9th Chinese International Student Festival	September 20, 2019	Cheongju	South Korea	Cheongju University	"Uh-Oh"; "Senorita"; "Hann (Alone)"; "Latata"	
2019 Cheonan World Dance Festival Opening Ceremony	September 25, 2019	Cheonan	South Korea	Heungtaryeong Theater	"Uh-Oh"; "Senorita"; "Latata"	
Sungkyul University Festival	October 2, 2019	Anyang	South Korea	Sungkyul University	"Uh-Oh"; "Senorita"; "Hann (Alone)"; "Latata"	
Inje Military One Heart Special Music Festival	October 8, 2019	Gangwon	South Korea	Inje Mini Stadium	"Uh-Oh"; "Senorita"; "Hann (Alone)"; "Latata"	
2019 Busan One Asia Festival (BOF)	October 20, 2019	Busan	South Korea	Hwamyeong Ecological Park	"Uh-Oh"; "Latata"	
41st Labor Day Song Festival (Note: The event was held with no on-site audience and pre-record performances to prevent the spread of COVID-19.)	May 1, 2020	Seoul	South Korea	KBS Hall	"Oh My God"	
Korea Music Drive-In Festival (KMDF 2020)	October 31, 2020	Seoul	South Korea	Incheon Port International Passenger Terminal	"Dumdi Dumdi"; "Latata"	
K-Community Festival	November 22, 2020	—	South Korea	—	"Hann (Alone)"; Ganggangsullae dance; "Dumdi Dumdi"; "Latata"	
K-Culture Festival in Andong – K-Performance City	November 29, 2020	—	South Korea	—	"Dumdi Dumdi"; "Uh-Oh"	
KPOP.FLEX	May 14, 2022	Frankfurt	Germany	Deutsche Bank Park	"Love Yourself" (Justin Bieber); "Tomboy"; "Latata"; "Oh My God"; "My Bag"	
KPOP.FLEX	May 15, 2022	Frankfurt	Germany	Deutsche Bank Park	"Tomboy"; "Latata"; "Oh My God"; "My Bag"	
2022 Keimyung University Daedong Festival <What's your Calla>	May 17, 2022	Daegu	South Korea	Keimyung University	"Latata"; "My Bag"; "Dumdi Dumdi"; "Tomboy"; "Oh My God"	
2022 DKU Festival Prism	May 19, 2022	Seoul	South Korea	Dankook University	"Oh My God"; "Dumdi Dumdi"; "Latata"; "Tomboy"; "My Bag"	
2022 Kyunghee University Spring Daedong Festival	May 26, 2022	Seoul	South Korea	Kyung Hee University International Campus Open-Air Theater	"Oh My God"; "Dumdi Dumdi"; "Latata"; "Tomboy"; "My Bag"	
Korea University Festival: IPSELENTI	May 27, 2022	Seoul	South Korea	Korea University	"Dumdi Dumdi"; "Latata"; "Tomboy"; "My Bag"; "Never Stop Me"	
2022 Waterbomb Festival Seoul	June 26, 2022	Seoul	South Korea	Seoul Jamsil Sports Complex	"Latata"; "Dumdi Dumdi"; "My Bag"; "Never Stop Me"; "Tomboy"	
2022 4seidonfest Water Music Festival	July 16, 2022	Busan	South Korea	Lotte Cinema Drive Osiria	"Latata"; "Dumdi Dumdi"; "My Bag"; "Never Stop Me"; "Tomboy"	
Hu Am I: MBTI	October 4, 2022	Daejeon	South Korea	Hannam University	"Lion"; "Latata"; "My Bag"; "Pop Stars"; "Tomboy"	
Myongji University White Horse Festival	October 5, 2022	Seoul	South Korea	Myongji University	"Lion"; "Latata"; "My Bag"; "Pop Stars"; "Tomboy"	
2022 Kangnam University Festival	October 5, 2022	Seoul	South Korea	Kangnam University	"Lion"; "Latata"; "My Bag"; "Pop Stars"; "Tomboy"	
Uni:On	October 6, 2022	Incheon	South Korea	Incheon National University	"Lion"; "Latata"; "My Bag"; "Pop Stars"; "Dumdi Dumdi"; "Tomboy"	
2022 KNSU Halloween Festival	October 27, 2022	Seoul	South Korea	Korea National Sport University	"Nxde"; "Latata"; "Dumdi Dumdi"; "My Bag"; "Tomboy"	
2022 Busan One Asia Festival	October 30, 2022	Busan	South Korea	Busan Citizens Park	Cancelled to respect the mourning period established after the crowd crush in Itaewon	
Head in the Clouds Festival	December 3, 2022	Jakarta	Indonesia	Community Park PIK 2	"Nxde"; "Lion"; "Latata"; "Liar"; "Never Stop Me'; "My Bag"; "Pop Stars"; "Tomboy"	
Lollapalooza	July 31, 2026	Chicago	United States	T-Mobile Stage	"Super Lady "; "Revenge"; "Villain Dies"; "Lion"; "Gimme Dat Love"; "Good Thing"; "Queencard"; "Morning"; "Wife"; "Fate"; "Crow"; "I Want That"; "Pop/Stars"; My Bag; "Tomboy"; "Mono"	

== Award shows ==
Event	Date	Country	Venue	Performed song(s)	Ref.
Brand of the Year Awards	July 24, 2018	South Korea	Grand Hyatt Seoul	"Latata"	
2018 Asia Artist Awards	November 28, 2018	South Korea	Incheon Namdong Gymnasium	"Hann (Alone)"	
2018 Melon Music Awards	December 1, 2018	South Korea	Gocheok Sky Dome	"Hann (Alone)"; "Latata"	
2018 MAMA Premiere in Korea	December 10, 2018	South Korea	Dongdaemun Design Plaza	"Hann (Alone)"; "Latata"	
33rd Golden Disc Awards	January 5, 2019	South Korea	Gocheok Sky Dome	"$$$"; "Latata"	
2018 Gaon Chart Music Awards	January 23, 2019	South Korea	Jamsil Arena	"Latata"	
1st The Fact Music Awards	April 24, 2019	South Korea	Incheon Namdong Gymnasium	"Senorita"; "Latata"	
14th Asia Model Awards	June 9, 2019	South Korea	Olympic Hall	"Senorita"	
3rd Soribada Best K-Music Awards	August 23, 2019	South Korea	Olympic Gymnastics Arena	"Uh-Oh"; "Senorita"; "Latata"	
Dong-A Sports Awards	December 11, 2019	South Korea	Four Seasons Hotel Seoul	"Uh-Oh"; "Latata"	
2019 Asia Artist Awards	November 26, 2019	Vietnam	Mỹ Đình National Stadium	"Uh-Oh"; "Senorita"	
34th Golden Disc Awards	January 5, 2020	South Korea	Gocheok Sky Dome	"Lion"	
9th Gaon Chart Music Awards	January 8, 2020	South Korea	Jamsil Arena	"Uh-Oh"	
32nd Korean PD Awards	April 29, 2020	South Korea	MBC Public Hall	"Oh My God"	
4th Soribada Best K-Music Awards	August 13, 2020	South Korea	—	"Dumdi Dumdi"	
2020 Asia Artist Awards	November 25, 2020	South Korea	—	"Dumdi Dumdi" (Remix version)	
2020 Mnet Asian Music Awards	December 6, 2020	South Korea	CJ ENM Contents World	"Dumdi Dumdi"; "Bad Girl Good Girl" (Note: Performed by Soojin, Soyeon and Yuqi) (Miss A) with Oh My Girl; "Listen to My Heart" (BoA)	
2020 The Fact Music Awards	December 12, 2020	South Korea	—	"Oh My God"	
35th Golden Disc Awards	January 10, 2021	South Korea	—	"Oh My God"	
30th Seoul Music Awards	January 31, 2021	South Korea	Olympic Gymnastics Arena	"Hwaa"	
5th The Fact Music Awards	October 8, 2022	South Korea	KSPO Dome	"Tomboy" (The Matrix stage concept)	
2022 Genie Music Awards	November 8, 2022	South Korea	Namdong Gymnasium	"Nxde"	
2022 Melon Music Awards	November 26, 2022	South Korea	Gocheok Sky Dome	Intro ("Villain Dies", "Habanera" with Hanna Lee); "Nxde"; "Tomboy"	
2022 MAMA Awards	November 30, 2022	Japan	Kyocera Dome Osaka	"Twenty-five, Twenty-one" (Note: Performed by Miyeon and Minnie); "My Bag"; "Tomboy (MAMA Ver.)" + "Beeswax Angel"	
37th Golden Disc Awards	January 7, 2023	Thailand	Rajamangala Stadium	"L3gend"; "Villain Dies"; "Tomboy"	
32nd Seoul Music Awards (Note: The performance was pre-recorded a day earlier. Miyeon was not present at the award ceremony.)	January 19, 2023	South Korea	Olympic Gymnastics Arena	"My Bag"; "Tomboy"	

== Television shows and specials ==
Event	Date	Country	Venue	Performed song(s)	Ref.
MOMO x Tardiness Prevention Live	May 21, 2018	South Korea	Daedong Taxation High School	"Latata"	
2018 SBS Love FM Russia World Cup Cheering Event	June 17–18, 2018	South Korea	Daehyeon Culture Park	"Latata"; "Maze"	
(G)I-dle in NY x flash mob	August 5, 2018	United States	Times Square; Washington Square Park (Le) Poisson Rouge	"Light My Body Up" (David Guetta); "Fake Love" (BTS); "Apeshit" (The Carters); "Latata"; "Maze"	
Show! Music Core 600th Anniversary Special Stage	August 11, 2018	South Korea	MBC Dream Center	"U-Go-Girl" (Lee Hyori ft. Nassun)	
China-Korea Cultural Exchange Night	August 18, 2018	South Korea	KBS Arena	"Hann (Alone)"; "Latata"; "Maze"	
SBS Radio Power FM 'Two Hours Escape Cultwo Show'	October 16, 2018	South Korea	Sinchon-dong, Seoul street	"Hann (Alone)"; "Latata"	
2018 League of Legends World Championship	November 3, 2018	South Korea	Incheon Munhak Stadium	"Pop/Stars" (Note: Performed by Miyeon and Soyeon)	
2018 KBS Music Bank Christmas special	December 21, 2018	South Korea	KBS Hall	"Latata"	
2018 SBS Gayo Daejeon: The Wave	December 25, 2018	South Korea	Gocheok Sky Dome	"New Wave"; "Latata"	
2018 KBS Gayo Daechukje	December 28, 2018	South Korea	KBS Hall	"Latata" (Remix version); "Kissing You" (Note: Performed by Yuqi) (Girls' Generation)	
2018 MBC Gayo Daejejeon	December 31, 2018	South Korea	MBC Dream Center	"Latata" (House version)	
Spotify On Stage JKT	October 4, 2019	Indonesia	Jakarta International Expo	"Hann (Alone)"; "Senorita"; "Uh-Oh"; "Blow Your Mind"; "Latata"	
2019 League of Legends World Championship	November 10, 2019	France	AccorHotels Arena	"True Damage"	
2020 Tainan Christmas & New Year Eve Party	December 21, 2019	Taiwan	Tainan City Government Square	"Uh-Oh"; "Hann (Alone)"; "Maze"; "Blow Your Mind"; "Senorita"; "Latata"	
Rakuten GirlsAward 2019 AUTUMN/WINTER	September 28, 2019	Japan	Makuhari Messe	"Uh-Oh"; "Hann (Alone)" (Japanese ver.); "Latata" (Japanese ver.)	
V Heartbeat Live	November 29, 2019	Vietnam	Ho Chi Minh City	"Uh-Oh"; "Latata"	
2019 MBC Gayo Daejejeon: The Chemistry	December 31, 2019	South Korea	MBC Dream Center	"Uh-Oh"; "Diva" (Note: Performed by Minnie, Soojin and Soyeon) (Beyoncé) with Itzy; Dance Performance; "Lion"	
Music Bank's Mid-Year Special: Music Bank Cinema	June 26, 2020	South Korea	KBS Hall	"Oh My God" (The Phantom of the Opera version)	
Korea On Stage – Suwon Hwaseong Fortress	August 22, 2020	South Korea	Hwaseong Fortress	"Dumdi Dumdi"	
Guest House with Chrissy Costanza	September 3, 2020	Worldwide	VENN	"Dumdi Dumdi"	
Show! Music Core 700th Anniversary Special Stage	November 7, 2020	South Korea	MBC Dream Center	"Don't Touch Me" (Refund Sisters)	
2020 KBS Gayo Daechukje: Connect	December 18, 2020	South Korea	KBS Hall	"I Don't Know" (Note: Performed by Shuhua) (Apink); "Oh My God"	
2020 SBS Gayo Daejeon: The Wonder Year	December 25, 2020	South Korea	—	"Dumdi Dumdi"; "My Song" (Note: Performed by Miyeon and Yuqi) (Kim Kwang-seok)	
KBA League of Legends: The Summoners Canyon	December 28, 2020	South Korea	V.SPACE	"Dumdi Dumdi"; "Latata"	
2020 MBC Gayo Daejejeon: The Moment	December 31, 2020	South Korea	MBC Dream Center	"In The Summer" (SSAK3); "Reflection" (Note: Performed by Soojin and Soyeon) (Fifth Harmony); "Oh My God"; "Across the Universe" (Note: Performed by Minnie) (Baek Ye-rin)	
Ep 524 You Hee-yeol's Sketchbook	January 15, 2021	South Korea	—	"Latata" (Live band version); "Dumdi Dumdi" (Live band version); "I Don't Love You" (Note: Performed by Miyeon, Minnie and Yuqi) (Urban Zakapa); "Hwaa"	
M Countdown: Storage M	February 25, 2021	South Korea	CJ E&M Center Studio	"Into the New World" (Girls' Generation)	
Music Bank's First-Half Special 2022: Summer Workshop	June 24, 2022	South Korea	KBS Hall	"Tomboy" (Festival version)	
My Playlist	June 28, 2022	Worldwide	Seezn	"Tomboy"; "Dumdi Dumdi"; "Latata"	
New Festa 2022	September 4, 2022	South Korea	Olympic Park 88 Lawn	"Latata"; "Dumdi Dumdi"; "My Bag"; "Tomboy"	
2022 KBS Gayo Daechukje	December 16, 2022	South Korea	Jamsil Arena	"After Breaking Up" (Y2K); "Nxde"; "Tomboy"	
2022 SBS Gayo Daejeon: The Live Shout Out	December 24, 2022	South Korea	Gocheok Sky Dome	"Comet" with Younha (Note: Performed by Minnie and Yuqi); "Villain Dies"; "Tomboy"	
2022 MBC Gayo Daejejeon: With Love	December 31, 2022	South Korea	MBC Dream Center	"Dangerously" (Note: Performed by Miyeon) (Charlie Puth) with Lee Mu-jin; "Step" (Kara)	
2023 Super Star	January 14, 2023 (Note: This date is for recording, and the broadcast is on January 21, 2023.)	Taiwan	Taipei Arena	"Nxde"; "My Bag"; "Tomboy"	
