= List of awards and nominations received by I-dle =

I-dle awards and nominations
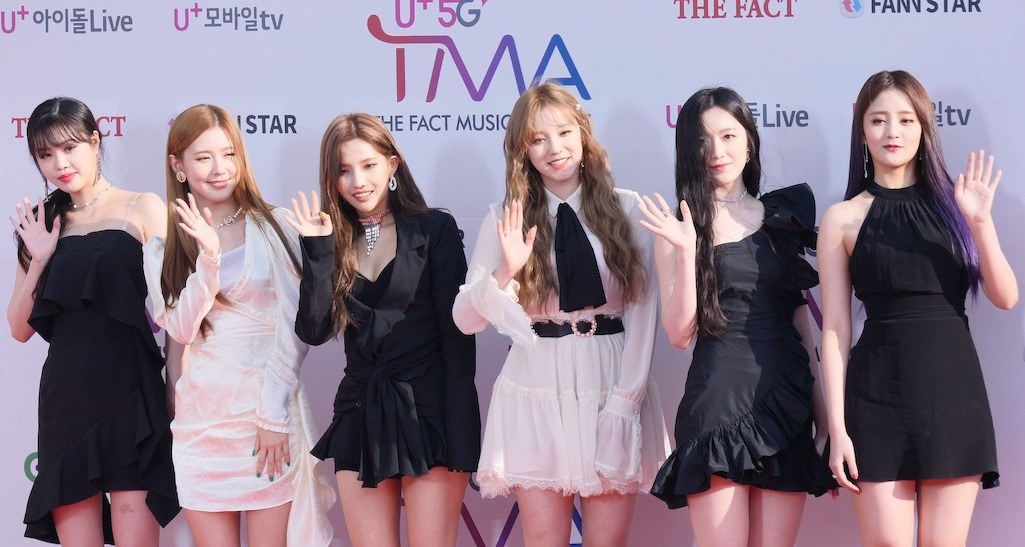
- (G)I-dle at The Fact Music Awards on April 24, 2019
Awards and nominations
Award	Wins	Nominations
APAN Music Awards	0	3
Asia Artist Awards	3	10
Asia Model Festival	1	1
Asian Pop Music Awards	8	12
Brand of the Year Awards	2	2
Circle Chart Music Awards	6	12
Genie Music Awards	3	15
Golden Disc Awards	8	23
Hanteo Music Awards	5	12
iHeartRadio Music Awards	0	2
Japan Gold Disc Award	1	1
Joox Hong Kong Top Music Awards	0	3
Joox Malaysia Top Music Awards	1	1
Joox Thailand Music Awards	0	1
K-Global Heart Dream Awards	1	1
K-World Dream Awards	1	1
Korea First Brand Awards	1	2
Korea Popular Music Awards	1	1
Korea Broadcasting Prizes	1	1
Korean Music Awards	0	6
MAMA Awards	5	27
Melon Music Awards	7	21
MTV Europe Music Awards	0	1
MTV Millennial Awards	0	1
MTV Video Music Award	0	2
NetEase Cloud Music Award	1	4
Seoul Music Awards	5	24
Soompi Awards	0	1
Soribada Best K-Music Awards	2	7
Spotify Awards	0	1
The Fact Music Awards	4	5
V Live Awards	1	2
Visionary Awards	1	1

Totals (Note: Certain award groups do not simply award one winner. They acknowledge several different recipients, have runners-up, and have third place. Since this is a specific recognition and is different from losing an award, runner-up mentions are considered wins in this award tally. For simplification and to avoid errors, each award in this list has been presumed to have had a prior nomination.)
- Wins: 69
- Nominations: 207

This is a list of awards and nominations received by I-dle, a South Korean girl group formed by Cube Entertainment, since their debut as (G)I-dle in 2018. After debuting with their first lead single "Latata" in May 2018, the group won several rookie awards from various year-end award shows in South Korea such as Asia Artist Awards, Gaon Chart Music Awards, Genie Music Awards, Golden Disc Awards, Korea Popular Music Awards, and Melon Music Awards.

== Awards and nominations ==
Name of the award ceremony, year presented, award category, nominee(s) and result of the nomination
Award ceremony	Year	Category	Nominee / work	Result	Ref.
APAN Music Awards	2020	APAN Top 10 (Bonsang)	(G)I-dle	Nominated	
APAN Music Awards	2020	Best Female Group	(G)I-dle	Nominated	
APAN Music Awards	2020	Best Icon	(G)I-dle	Nominated	
Asia Artist Awards	2018	Most Popular Artists (Singer) – Top 50	(G)I-dle	Nominated	
Asia Artist Awards	2018	Rookie of the Year – Music	(G)I-dle	Won	
Asia Artist Awards	2019	Most Popular Artists (Singer) – Top 50	(G)I-dle	Nominated	
Asia Artist Awards	2019	Starnews Popularity Award – Female Group	(G)I-dle	Nominated	
Asia Artist Awards	2019	Groove Award	(G)I-dle	Won	
Asia Artist Awards	2020	Best Emotive Award	(G)I-dle	Won	
Asia Artist Awards	2022	DCM Popularity Award – Female Singer	(G)I-dle	Nominated	
Asia Artist Awards	2022	Idolplus Popularity Award – Singer	(G)I-dle	Nominated	
Asia Artist Awards	2023	Popularity Award – Singer (Female)	(G)I-dle	Nominated	
Asia Artist Awards	2026	Popularity Award – Group (Female)	(G)I-dle	Pending	
Asia Model Festival	2019	New Star Award (Singer)	(G)I-dle	Won	
Asian Pop Music Awards (Note: Hosted by the Hong Kong Asia Pacific International Group and Sunway Records, the Asian Pop Music Awards bases its winners on the "Asian Pop Music Chart" which opened in September 2019.)	2021	Best Lyricist (Overseas)	"Hwaa"	Nominated	
Asian Pop Music Awards	2021	Best Arranger (Overseas)	"Last Dance"	Nominated	
Asian Pop Music Awards	2022	Best Group (Overseas)	I Never Die	Won	
Asian Pop Music Awards	2022	Top 20 Albums of the Year (Overseas)	I Never Die	Won	
Asian Pop Music Awards	2022	Top 20 Songs of the Year (Overseas)	"Tomboy"	Won	
Asian Pop Music Awards	2022	People's Choice Award (Overseas)	I Never Die	2nd place	
Asian Pop Music Awards	2022	Song of the Year (Overseas)	"Tomboy"	Nominated	
Asian Pop Music Awards	2022	Best Dance Performance (Overseas)	"Tomboy"	Nominated	
Asian Pop Music Awards	2024	Best Album of the Year	"I feel"	Won	
Asian Pop Music Awards	2024	People's Choice Award	(G)I-dle	Won	
Asian Pop Music Awards	2024	Top 20 Songs of the Year (Overseas)	"Queencard"	Won	
Asian Pop Music Awards	2024	Top 20 Albums Of The Year (Overseas)	"I feel"	Won	
Brand of the Year Awards	2018	Female Rookie Idol of the Year	(G)I-dle	Won	
Brand of the Year Awards	2022	Female Idol of the Year	(G)I-dle	Won	
Circle Chart Music Awards	2018	Artist of the Year (Digital Music) – August	"Hann (Alone)"	Nominated	
Circle Chart Music Awards	2018	New Artist of the Year – Digital	(G)I-dle	Won	
Circle Chart Music Awards	2019	Artist of the Year (Digital Music) – February	"Senorita"	Nominated	
Circle Chart Music Awards	2019	World Rookie of the Year	(G)I-dle	Won	
Circle Chart Music Awards	2020	Artist of the Year (Digital Music) – August	"Dumdi Dumdi"	Nominated	
Circle Chart Music Awards	2020	MuBeat Female Global Choice	(G)I-dle	Nominated	
Circle Chart Music Awards	2022	Artist of the Year (Digital Music) – January	"Hwaa"	Nominated	
Circle Chart Music Awards	2023	Global Digital Music – March	"Tomboy"	Won	
Circle Chart Music Awards	2023	Global Digital Music – October	"Nxde"	Nominated	
Circle Chart Music Awards	2024	Artist of the Year – Global Streaming	"Queencard"	Won	
Circle Chart Music Awards	2024	Artist of the Year – Digital	"Queencard"	Won	
Circle Chart Music Awards	2024	Artist of the Year – Streaming Unique Listeners	"Queencard"	Won	
Genie Music Awards	2018	The Top Artist	(G)I-dle	Nominated	
Genie Music Awards	2018	The Female New Artist	(G)I-dle	Won	
Genie Music Awards	2018	Genie Music Popularity Award	(G)I-dle	Nominated	
Genie Music Awards	2019	The Top Artist	(G)I-dle	Nominated	
Genie Music Awards	2019	The Female Group	(G)I-dle	Nominated	
Genie Music Awards	2019	The Performing Artist (Female)	(G)I-dle	Nominated	
Genie Music Awards	2019	Genie Music Popularity Award	(G)I-dle	Nominated	
Genie Music Awards	2019	Global Popularity Award	(G)I-dle	Nominated	
Genie Music Awards	2022	Best Female Group	(G)I-dle	Won	
Genie Music Awards	2022	Best Record Award	"Tomboy"	Won	
Genie Music Awards	2022	Song of the Year	"Tomboy"	Nominated	
Genie Music Awards	2022	Album of the Year	I Never Die	Nominated	
Genie Music Awards	2022	Singer of the Year	(G)I-dle	Nominated	
Genie Music Awards	2022	Genie Music Popularity Award	(G)I-dle	Nominated	
Genie Music Awards	2022	Best Female Performance Award	(G)I-dle	Nominated	
Golden Disc Awards	2019	Digital Daesang	"Latata"	Nominated	
Golden Disc Awards	2019	Rookie of the Year – Digital	(G)I-dle	Won	
Golden Disc Awards	2019	Popularity Award	(G)I-dle	Nominated	
Golden Disc Awards	2019	NetEase Most Popular K-pop Star	(G)I-dle	Nominated	
Golden Disc Awards	2020	Best Female Performance Award	"Lion"	Won	
Golden Disc Awards	2021	Best Female Performance Award	"Oh My God"	Won	
Golden Disc Awards	2022	Album Bonsang - Main Prize	I Burn	Nominated	
Golden Disc Awards	2022	Digital Song Bonsang	"Hwaa"	Nominated	
Golden Disc Awards	2022	Seezn Most Popular Artist Award	(G)I-dle	Nominated	
Golden Disc Awards	2023	Digital Song Bonsang	"Tomboy"	Won	
Golden Disc Awards	2023	Most Popular Artist	(G)I-dle	Won	
Golden Disc Awards	2023	Digital Daesang	"Tomboy"	Nominated	
Golden Disc Awards	2023	Album Bonsang	I Love	Nominated	
Golden Disc Awards	2024	Digital Song Bonsang	"Queencard"	Won	
Golden Disc Awards	2024	Digital Daesang	"Queencard"	Nominated	
Golden Disc Awards	2024	Album Bonsang	I Feel	Nominated	
Golden Disc Awards	2025	Album Bonsang	2	Won	
Golden Disc Awards	2025	Album Daesang	2	Nominated	
Golden Disc Awards	2025	Digital Song Bonsang	"Fate"	Won	
Golden Disc Awards	2025	Digital Daesang	"Fate"	Nominated	
Golden Disc Awards	2025	Most Popular Artist – Female	(G)I-dle	Nominated	
Golden Disc Awards	2026	Album Bonsang	We Are	Nominated	
Golden Disc Awards	2026	Most Popular Artist – Female	I-dle	Nominated	
Hanteo Music Awards	2022	Artist of the Year (Bonsang)	(G)I-dle	Won	
Hanteo Music Awards	2023	Artist of the Year (Bonsang)	(G)I-dle	Won	
Hanteo Music Awards	2024	Best Song (Daesang)	"Fate"	Won	
Hanteo Music Awards	2024	Artist of the Year (Bonsang)	(G)I-dle	Won	
Hanteo Music Awards	2024	Global Generation Icon	(G)I-dle	Won	
Hanteo Music Awards	2024	Global Artist – Africa	(G)I-dle	Nominated	
Hanteo Music Awards	2024	Global Artist – Asia	(G)I-dle	Nominated	
Hanteo Music Awards	2024	Global Artist – Europe	(G)I-dle	Nominated	
Hanteo Music Awards	2024	Global Artist – North America	(G)I-dle	Nominated	
Hanteo Music Awards	2024	Global Artist – Oceania	(G)I-dle	Nominated	
Hanteo Music Awards	2024	Global Artist – South America	(G)I-dle	Nominated	
Hanteo Music Awards	2024	WhosFandom Award – Female	(G)I-dle	Nominated	
iHeartRadio Music Awards	2024	Best Duo/Group of the Year	(G)I-dle	Nominated	
iHeartRadio Music Awards	2024	K-pop Artist of the Year	(G)I-dle	Nominated	
Japan Gold Disc Award	2020	Best 3 New Artists (Asia)	(G)I-dle	Won	
Joox Hong Kong Top Music Awards	2020	Top 20 Kpop songs	"Oh My God"	Nominated	
Joox Hong Kong Top Music Awards	2020	Top 20 Kpop songs	"I'm the Trend"	Nominated	
Joox Hong Kong Top Music Awards	2020	Top 20 Kpop songs	"Dumdi Dumdi"	Nominated	
Joox Malaysia Top Music Awards	2021	Top 5 K-Pop Hits (Mid Year)	"Hwaa"	Won	
Joox Thailand Music Awards	2022	Top Social Global Artist of the year	(G)I-dle	Nominated	
K-Global Heart Dream Awards	2023	K-Global Best Music Award	(G)I-dle	Won	
K-World Dream Awards	2024	Best Music	(G)I-dle	Won	
Korea First Brand Awards (Note: Hosted by the Korea Consumer Brand Committee and the Korea Consumer Forum, the Korea First Brand Awards bases its winners on a nationwide South Korean survey.)	2021	Hot Trend	(G)I-dle	Won	
Korea First Brand Awards	2022	Female Idol (Rising Star) Award	(G)I-dle	Nominated	
Korea Popular Music Awards (Note: The awards ceremony is organized by the Korea Singers Association, the Korea Entertainment Producer's Association, the Recording Industry Association of Korea, the Federation of Korean Music Performers, and the Korea Music Copyright Association.)	2018	Best New Artist	(G)I-dle	Won	
Korea Broadcasting Prizes (Note: The Korean Broadcasting Awards were established in 1973 and held annually by the Korean Broadcasting Association. It has been selecting works and broadcasters that have delivered the public value of terrestrial broadcasting to viewers and contributed to the development of broadcasting. Winners are selected by a panel of 24 judges who are industry experts. Only one award for musicians is given each year.)	2022	Best Singer	(G)I-dle	Won	
Korean Music Awards	2020	Best Pop Song	"Lion"	Nominated	
Korean Music Awards	2023	Song of the Year	"Tomboy"	Nominated	
Korean Music Awards	2023	Best K-pop Song	"Tomboy"	Nominated	
Korean Music Awards	2023	Best K-pop Album	I Love	Nominated	
Korean Music Awards	2023	Best K-pop Album	I Never Die	Nominated	
Korean Music Awards	2025	Best K-pop Album	2	Nominated	
MAMA Awards	2018	Best of Next	(G)I-dle	Won	
MAMA Awards	2018	Best New Female Artist	(G)I-dle	Nominated	
MAMA Awards	2018	Artist of the Year	(G)I-dle	Nominated	
MAMA Awards	2019	Song of the Year	"Senorita"	Nominated	
MAMA Awards	2019	Best Dance Performance – Female Group	"Senorita"	Nominated	
MAMA Awards	2019	Worldwide Fans' Choice Top 10	(G)I-dle	Nominated	
MAMA Awards	2021	Best Female Group	(G)I-dle	Nominated	
MAMA Awards	2021	Artist of the Year	(G)I-dle	Nominated	
MAMA Awards	2021	Worldwide Fan's Choice Top 10	(G)I-dle	Nominated	
MAMA Awards	2021	Album of the Year	I Burn	Nominated	
MAMA Awards	2022	Favorite Female Group	(G)I-dle	Won	
MAMA Awards	2022	Album of the Year	I Never Die	Nominated	
MAMA Awards	2022	Artist of the Year	(G)I-dle	Nominated	
MAMA Awards	2022	Best Female Group	(G)I-dle	Nominated	
MAMA Awards	2022	Best Dance Performance – Female Group	"Tomboy"	Nominated	
MAMA Awards	2022	Song of the Year	"Tomboy"	Nominated	
MAMA Awards	2022	Worldwide Fan's Choice Top 10	(G)I-dle	Nominated	
MAMA Awards	2023	Favorite Global Performer - Female Group	(G)I-dle	Won	
MAMA Awards	2023	Artist of the Year	(G)I-dle	Nominated	
MAMA Awards	2023	Best Female Group	(G)I-dle	Nominated	
MAMA Awards	2023	Worldwide Fan's Choice Top 10	(G)I-dle	Nominated	
MAMA Awards	2023	Album of the Year	I Feel	Nominated	
MAMA Awards	2023	Best Dance Performance - Female Group	"Queencard"	Nominated	
MAMA Awards	2023	Best Music Video	"Queencard"	Nominated	
MAMA Awards	2023	Song of the Year	"Queencard"	Nominated	
MAMA Awards	2024	Best Vocal Performance – Group	"Fate"	Won	
MAMA Awards	2024	Fans' Choice Female	(G)I-dle	Won	
Melon Music Awards	2018	Best New Artist (Female)	(G)I-dle	Won	
Melon Music Awards	2020	Top 10 Artist	(G)I-dle	Nominated	
Melon Music Awards	2022	Best Female Group	(G)I-dle	Nominated	
Melon Music Awards	2022	Top 10 Artist	(G)I-dle	Won	
Melon Music Awards	2022	Artist of the Year	(G)I-dle	Nominated	
Melon Music Awards	2022	Song of the Year	Tomboy	Nominated	
Melon Music Awards	2022	Best Music Video	Tomboy	Won	
Melon Music Awards	2022	Album of the Year	I Never Die	Nominated	
Melon Music Awards	2023	Millions Top 10 Artist	I Feel	Won	
Melon Music Awards	2023	Top 10 Artist	(G)I-dle	Won	
Melon Music Awards	2023	Album of the Year	I Feel	Nominated	
Melon Music Awards	2023	Artist of the Year	(G)I-dle	Nominated	
Melon Music Awards	2023	Best Female Group	(G)I-dle	Nominated	
Melon Music Awards	2023	Song of the Year	"Queencard"	Nominated	
Melon Music Awards	2024	Record of the Year	(G)I-dle	Won	
Melon Music Awards	2024	Top 10 Artist	(G)I-dle	Won	
Melon Music Awards	2024	Album of the Year	2	Nominated	
Melon Music Awards	2024	Artist of the Year	(G)I-dle	Nominated	
Melon Music Awards	2024	Best Female Group	(G)I-dle	Nominated	
Melon Music Awards	2024	Kakao Bank Everyone's Star	(G)I-dle	Nominated	
Melon Music Awards	2024	Song of the Year	"Fate"	Nominated	
MTV Europe Music Awards	2018	Best Korean Act	(G)I-dle	Nominated	
MTV Millennial Awards	2021	K-Pop Dominion	(G)I-dle	Nominated	
MTV Video Music Awards	2020	Best K-Pop Video	"Oh My God"	Nominated	
MTV Video Music Awards	2021	Best K-Pop Video	"Dumdi Dumdi"	Nominated	
NetEase Cloud Music Award	2019	Popular Artist (Korean female solo/groups)	(G)I-dle	Nominated	
NetEase Cloud Music Award	2020	Popular Artist of the Year	(G)I-dle	Nominated	
NetEase Cloud Music Award	2020	Popular Album of the Year (Korean/Japanese album)	I Trust	Won	
NetEase Cloud Music Award	2020	Best Creativity of the Year (Korean/Japanese album)	I Trust	Nominated	
Seoul Music Awards	2019	New Artist Award	(G)I-dle	Nominated	
Seoul Music Awards	2019	Hallyu Special Award	(G)I-dle	Nominated	
Seoul Music Awards	2019	Popularity Award	(G)I-dle	Nominated	
Seoul Music Awards	2020	Main Award (Bonsang)	(G)I-dle	Nominated	
Seoul Music Awards	2020	Hallyu Special Award	(G)I-dle	Nominated	
Seoul Music Awards	2020	Popularity Award	(G)I-dle	Nominated	
Seoul Music Awards	2020	QQ Music Most Popular K-Pop Artist Award	(G)I-dle	Nominated	
Seoul Music Awards	2021	Main Award (Bonsang)	(G)I-dle	Nominated	
Seoul Music Awards	2021	Best Performance	(G)I-dle	Won	
Seoul Music Awards	2021	K-Wave Popularity Award	(G)I-dle	Nominated	
Seoul Music Awards	2021	Popularity Award	(G)I-dle	Nominated	
Seoul Music Awards	2022	Main Award (Bonsang)	(G)I-dle	Nominated	
Seoul Music Awards	2022	K-wave Popularity Award	(G)I-dle	Nominated	
Seoul Music Awards	2022	Popularity Award	(G)I-dle	Nominated	
Seoul Music Awards	2023	Main Award (Bonsang)	(G)I-dle	Won	
Seoul Music Awards	2023	Best Performance	(G)I-dle	Won	
Seoul Music Awards	2023	K-wave Popularity Award	(G)I-dle	Nominated	
Seoul Music Awards	2023	Hallyu Special Award	(G)I-dle	Nominated	
Seoul Music Awards	2023	Idolplus Best Star Award	(G)I-dle	Nominated	
Seoul Music Awards	2025	Grand Prize (Daesang)	I-dle	Won	
Seoul Music Awards	2025	Main Prize (Bonsang)	I-dle	Won	
Seoul Music Awards	2025	Popularity Award	I-dle	Nominated	
Seoul Music Awards	2025	K-Wave Special Award	I-dle	Nominated	
Seoul Music Awards	2025	K-pop World Choice – Group	I-dle	Nominated	
Soompi Awards	2019	Rookie of the Year	(G)I-dle	Nominated	
Soribada Best K-Music Awards	2019	Best Artist of the Year (Bonsang)	(G)I-dle	Nominated	
Soribada Best K-Music Awards	2019	Female Popularity Award	(G)I-dle	Nominated	
Soribada Best K-Music Awards	2019	New Wave Award	(G)I-dle	Won	
Soribada Best K-Music Awards	2020	Best Artist of the Year (Bonsang)	(G)I-dle	Nominated	
Soribada Best K-Music Awards	2020	Female Popularity award	(G)I-dle	Nominated	
Soribada Best K-Music Awards	2020	Global Artist Award	(G)I-dle	Nominated	
Soribada Best K-Music Awards	2020	Performance Award	(G)I-dle	Won	
Spotify Awards (Note: The Spotify Awards founded in 2020 is the first-ever award ceremony 100% based on user-generated data from Mexico and Latin America.)	2020	Most-Streamed Kpop Female Artist	(G)I-dle	Nominated	
The Fact Music Awards	2018	Next Leader	(G)I-dle	Won	
The Fact Music Awards	2019	Dance Performer of the Year	(G)I-dle	Won	
The Fact Music Awards	2020	Global Hottest	(G)I-dle	Won	
The Fact Music Awards	2020	TMA Popularity Award	(G)I-dle	Nominated	
The Fact Music Awards	2022	Artist of the Year (Bonsang)	(G)I-dle	Won	
V Live Awards	2019	Global Rookie Top 5	(G)I-dle	Won	
V Live Awards	2020	V Heartbeat Stage of Kpop	(G)I-dle	Nominated	
Visionary Awards (Note: Visionary Awards, which started in 2020, selects and awards people who lead roles in the Korean entertainment industry. It highlights the meaning and achievements of a person whose chosen trend keywords penetrated the entertainment industry, including broadcasting, movies, music, and performances, and presents the next vision of the cultural sector with outstanding achievements and influence.)	2023	2023 Visionary	(G)I-dle	Won	

== Other accolades ==
=== State and cultural honors ===
Name of country, year given, and name of honor
Country	Award ceremony	Year	Honor or award	Ref.
South Korea	Korean Popular Culture and Arts Awards (Note: Honors are given at the Korean Popular Culture and Arts Awards, arranged by the Korea Creative Content Agency and hosted by the Ministry of Culture, Sports and Tourism. They are awarded to those who have contributed to the arts and South Korea's pop culture.)	2025	Minister of Culture, Sports and Tourism Commendation	

=== Listicles ===
Name of publisher, year listed, name of listicle, and placement
Publisher	Year	Listicle	Placement	Ref.
Billboard Korea	2018	Best Rookie	1st	
Forbes Asia	2026	30 Under 30	Placed	
Forbes Korea	2025	K-Idol of the Year 30	26th	
YouTube Rewind	2018	Top 10 Rising Stars	3rd	
