= I Am Free-ty World Tour =

2023 concert tour by (G)I-dle

- Tour by (G)I-dle
- Associated album: I Feel
- Start date: June 17, 2023
- End date: October 29, 2023
- No. of shows: 12 in Asia; 6 in North America; 6 in Europe; 24 in total
- Attendance: 130,000

(G)I-dle concert chronology
- Just Me ( )I-dle World Tour (2022); I Am Free-ty World Tour (2023); I-dol World Tour (2024)

I Am Free-ty World Tour was the second worldwide concert tour by South Korean girl group (G)I-dle, in support of their sixth extended play I Feel (2023). The world tour began on June 17, 2023, in Seoul, South Korea, and concluded on October 29 in Singapore. The tour consisted of 24 shows in 18 countries in Asia, North America, and Europe.

== Background ==
In April 2023, (G)I-dle announced that they would be embarking on their second world tour titled "I Am Free-ty", following their Just Me ( )I-dle World Tour the previous year. It began on June 17, with two shows in Seoul's Jamsil Indoor Stadium before continuing across Asia and North America. On May 31, the tour was expanded with five new shows in Europe.

== Setlist ==
This set list is from the shows in Seoul, South Korea. It is not intended to represent all shows from the tour.

1. "Dumdi Dumdi"
2. "Latata"
3. "$$$"
4. "Never Stop Me"
5. "Allergy"
6. "Uh-Oh"
7. "Queencard"
8. "Drive" (Miyeon solo)
9. "Dahlia" (solo version; Minnie solo)
10. "Psycho" (Soyeon solo)
11. "Boys" (Britney Spears cover; Shuhua dance solo)
12. "Could It Be" (unreleased song at the time; Yuqi solo)
13. "Nxde"
14. "Put It Straight" (Nightmare version)
15. "Lucid"
16. "All Night"
17. "The Baddest" / "Pop/Stars" (K/DA cover)
18. "My Bag"
19. "Tomboy"

Encore

June 17 (Day 1)

1. "I'm the Trend"
2. "Give Me Your"
3. "Where Is Love"
4. "Lion"
5. "Oh My God"
6. "Peter Pan"

June 18 (Day 2)

1. "I'm the Trend"
2. "Liar"
3. "Reset"
4. "What's Your Name"
5. "Luv U"
6. "Lion"
7. "Paradise"
Notes
- During the encore stage at the Taipei shows, they performed a cover of 831 "Miss You 3000" in Mandarin.
- During the encore stage at the Bangkok show, they performed a cover of Nont Tanont "First Love" in Thai.
- During the encore stage at the Hong Kong shows, they performed a cover of Beyond "Like You" in Cantonese.
- Starting from the San Francisco show, they began performing their English single "I DO" at the encore stage.
- During the encore stage at the Tokyo shows, they performed their Japanese song “Tung-Tung (Empty)”, from their Japanese EP, for the first time in place of “I DO”.
- During the encore stage at the Macau shows, they performed a cover of Beyond "Bu Zai You Yu" in Cantonese.

== Tour dates ==
Date (2023)	City	Country	Venue	Attendance
June 17	Seoul	South Korea	Jamsil Arena	10,000
June 18	Seoul	South Korea	Jamsil Arena	10,000
July 1	Taipei	Taiwan	Taipei Music Center	9,000
July 2	Taipei	Taiwan	Taipei Music Center	9,000
July 15	Bangkok	Thailand	Thunder Dome	—
July 22	Hong Kong	China	AsiaWorld–Expo	—
July 23	Hong Kong	China	AsiaWorld–Expo	—
August 4	San Francisco	United States	Bill Graham Civic Auditorium	
August 6	Los Angeles	United States	Peacock Theater	
August 9	Grand Prairie	United States	Texas Trust CU Theatre	—
August 13	New York City	United States	The Theatre at MSG	
August 15	Atlanta	United States	Fox Theatre	
August 17	Rosemont	United States	Rosemont Theatre	
September 9	London	United Kingdom	Wembley Arena	10,000
September 11	Amsterdam	Netherlands	AFAS Live	—
September 13	Paris	France	Zénith Paris	—
September 16	Brussels	Belgium	Forest National	
September 18	Berlin	Germany	Verti Music Hall	—
September 19	Berlin	Germany	Verti Music Hall	—
September 27	Tokyo	Japan	Tachikawa Stage Garden	—
September 28	Tokyo	Japan	Tachikawa Stage Garden	—
October 13	Macau	China	Galaxy Arena	21,000
October 14	Macau	China	Galaxy Arena	21,000
October 29	Singapore		Singapore Indoor Stadium	—
Total				130,000
