= Just Me ( )I-dle World Tour =

2022 concert tour by (G)I-dle

(G)I-dle World Tour "Just Me ( )I-dle"
- World tour by (G)I-dle
- Promotional poster for the tour's South Korean leg
- Associated album: I Never Die
- Start date: June 17, 2022
- End date: October 1, 2022
- Legs: 3
- No. of shows: 10 in Asia; 10 in North America; 1 in South America; 21 in total

(G)I-dle concert chronology
- (G)I-dle Online Concert "I-Land: Who Am I" (2020); (G)I-dle World Tour "Just Me ( )I-dle" (2022); I Am Free-ty World Tour (2023)

Just Me ( )I-dle was the debut concert tour headlined by South Korean girl group (G)I-dle. The name was derived from the lyric featured in the song "Tomboy" of their first studio album, I Never Die (2022). The world tour commenced with three shows in Seoul on June 17, 2022, and continued onto several cities in Asia, North America, and South America, comprising 21 shows in 18 countries. This is the group's first in-person concert tour since their debut in 2018. The tour ended on October 1, in Singapore.

== Background ==
On May 12, Cube shared an official announcement through a poster on social media that the group's 1st tour will be called 2022 (G)I-dle World Tour " ( )I-dle" with the first leg kicking off in Seoul. Cube added additional concerts in Seoul not long after due to overwhelming demand. It was reported that all three dates in Seoul including the additional date were sold out in three minutes. Due to huge demand, the group's New York City and Mexico City show has been moved to a larger venue from Webster Hall to Terminal 5 and Auditorio BB to Pepsi Center WTC, respectively. The concert in Japan on September 16 and 17, was a 2-day virtual pay-per-view concert through distribution platform, Uliza.

== Concert synopsis ==
The five-themed performance overwhelms the stage with different performances and atmospheres – '[HEROiNE: Cliché] JUST ME (G)I-DLE' filled with the group's trademark visual color, 'a tragic HEROiNE' which was tied traditional Korean folk elements, 'I NEVER DIE' which kicked off the incorporation of a live band, the pop-punk reminiscent 'THiS iS My ATTiTUDE,' and lastly, the encore stage 'iT NEVER ENDS: NEVERLAND'. The show begins with (G)I-dle appearing on the stage in all-black outfits under a red light with swirling smoke effects, haunting Gregorian chant filling the dark venue and the sound of the bell opening into "Oh My God", then continued with "Villain Dies" and debut single "Latata" while the fans coloured the venue with light sticks. The first theme finished with "Blow Your Mind," "Senorita", and summer songs "Dumdi Dumdi" and "Luv U", which they performed with a tropical backdrop and gold streamers falling over the stage and crowd.

In the second theme of 'a tragic HEROiNE', (G)I-dle appeared in floral dresses that incorporated traditional Korean folk motifs, embroidered with white and red flowers. The stage design centering around dream-like concept with a large moon, which subsequently served as the backdrop to the performance of "Hann (Alone in Winter)", "Hann (Alone)", "Moon", "Already", "Hwaa" accompanied by dancers reflecting the refined mood of these songs' concepts. As they danced, the moon would shift into different colours and shapes, with the members' shadows projected behind them.

The third theme was 'I Never DiE', (G)I-dle performed their 2019 Queendom single "Lion" and "Liar," where they joined by their back-up dancers and a live band, who remained to perform behind them throughout the rest of the concert. The stage was designed to match the original 'regality' of the "Lion" finale performance, with the members performing in front of a royal red backdrop with large golden frames outlining the jumbotron stage video. In addition, from the stage of "Lion", all the members used hand microphones. For the "Liar" stage, the group performed using a standing microphone.

The group proceeded with "Never Stop Me" to start the fourth segment 'I NEVER DIE', during which they performed while running around the stage and interacting with the live band in a way that mimicked a lively rock concert, and subsequently performed "Uh-Oh". After the song ended, Yuqi boasted, "I like band music, I did it with wonderful people while preparing for the concert." Next, (G)I-dle sang "My Bag", which has a catchy hip-hop melody and performs a strong hip-shaking (twerking) choreography. The members battled for the place of 'Twerking Queen, ' making the audience laugh as they set out to determine which one could do the twerk-like "My Bag" point choreography the best. They then sings a cover of K/DA's "Pop/Stars" and performs an explicit version of "Tomboy". The concert ended with "I'm the Trend", "Polaroid", and "Escape", during which the songs were performed as an encore under the theme 'ENCORE iT NEVER ENDS: NEVERLAND'.

== Critical reception ==
Lee Seung-rok of My Daily praised the team's professionalism in the fifth year of debut and their comfortable performance on stage, being this their first offline concert. He wrote: "(G)I-dle's abilities reached their peak when they performed "Hwaa" that was released last year after going through the songs of the same name, "Hann (Alone)", "Hann (Alone in Winter)". This is because, with leader Soyeon, Miyeon, Minnie, Yuqi, and Shuhua in the lead, the members' mixed songs, gestures, eyes and expressions felt as if they were looking at a work of art. Last year, the remaining members filled the vacancy left by a member, and the synergy of the whole (G)I-dle has matured." Kim Hee-seo from Celev acknowledged "(G)I-dle's colourful set list that contains their unique personality was pleasing to the eyes and ears - from rock music to bands and hip-hop" and added that she enjoyed the stage regardless of whether it was their first offline concert and world tour. Kim Soo-jung from No Cut News commenced that the performance shown by (G)I-dle shows "why [they] are recognized as 'stage-type' and 'performance-type' singers." Reviewing the same show, Lee Mi-young of Joynews24 wrote: For over two hours, they showed unshakable singing ability on stage and added perfection to the stage with their splendid performance. Through various stages ranging from 21 songs, they exuded various charms, exuding their unique charisma, sexy, and girl crush, as well as cute and lovely. Costumes such as black hot pants, crop tops, and dresses with flower decorations delighted the eyes of the fans, and the live band lit up on the stage to show off the sound.

After San Francisco's show, in a review from This Is Hype!, Duey Guison commended the (G)I-dle's vocals stating they were "singing live–and it's very evident especially with Minnie, Yuqi, Miyeon, and Shuhua singing their respective lines and Soyeon simply standing out with her killer rap lines" while also praised their "impressive" stage interaction with the audience as they were "very lively" without the need for translators and praised the costume production "that were fit for every arc of the concert". He concluded in his review that they "set a good barometer on what to expect in a live KPop concert". Evi from The Seoul Story, who reviewed the Kasablanka concert in Jakarta, wrote that the group "proved they are multi-talented in presenting diverse sides of themselves on stage while blending them all into one cohesive storyline", and concluded that "(G)I-DLE successfully pulled off a memorable night ... with their authentic selves and amazing performances".

A reviewer from Selective Hearing was mixed in his review during the Seattle concert, saying it "(G)I-dle was still fantastic from far away" and "It was not the fault of (G)I-dle". He was critical towards the external things outside the stage – dead crowd, cramped space, heat exhaustion, dehydration, cell phone cameras blocking the view, fast-paced hi-touch event feeling like "slapping random gloved hands attached to pretty women".

== Set list ==
This set list is from the shows in Seoul, South Korea. It is not intended to represent all shows from the tour.

1. "Oh My God"
2. "Villain Dies"
3. "Latata"
4. "Blow Your Mind"
5. "Senorita"
6. "Dumdi Dumdi"
7. "Luv U"
8. "Hann (Alone in Winter)"
9. "Hann (Alone)"
10. "Moon"
11. "Already"
12. "Hwaa"
13. "Lion"
14. "Liar"
15. "Never Stop Me"
16. "Uh-Oh"
17. "My Bag"
18. "Pop/Stars" (original by K/DA)
19. "Tomboy" (explicit)

Encore

June 17 (Day 1)

1. "I'm the Trend"
2. "Polaroid"

June 18 (Day 2)

1. "I'm the Trend"
2. "Escape"

June 19 (Day 3)

1. "I'm the Trend"
2. "Polaroid"
3. "Escape"
Notes
- During the encore stage of the second show in Seoul, "Polaroid" was replaced by a performance of "Escape".
- During the encore stage of the third show in Seoul, "Polaroid" was again performed before being followed by "Escape".
- Starting from the Los Angeles show, "Polaroid" and "Escape" were removed and replaced by the English Version of "Latata" at the encore stage, for the duration of the North and South America legs.
- During the show in Mexico City, Shuhua left the stage during "My Bag" due to fatigue, but returned at "I'm the Trend". "Latata (English version)" and "Tomboy" were swapped on the set list with "Latata (English version)" being performed before "Tomboy".
- During the encore stage at the Bangkok show, "Polaroid" and "Escape" were re-added to the setlist, replacing the English Version of "Latata". A fan project was organized to celebrate Soyeon's birthday in advance by holding up a birthday banner in during her rap.
- During the encore stage of the Jakarta show, "Polaroid" was re-added to the setlist.
- During the encore stage of the Kuala Lumpur show, "Polaroid" was replaced by a performance of "Escape". A fan project was organized to celebrate Yuqi's birthday according to the Lunar calendar by holding up a birthday banner before the encore.
- During the encore stage of the Manila show, "Polaroid" was re-added to the setlist.
- During the encore stage of the Tokyo shows, "Polaroid" and "Escape" were re-added to the setlist.
- During the encore stage of the Singapore show, "Polaroid" was replaced by a performance of "Escape".

== Tour dates ==
List of concerts, showing date, city, country, venue, and attendance
Date (2022)	City	Country	Venue	Attendance
June 17	Seoul	South Korea	Olympic Hall	7,500
June 18	Seoul	South Korea	Olympic Hall	7,500
June 19	Seoul	South Korea	Olympic Hall	7,500
July 22	Los Angeles	United States	The Novo	20,000
July 24	San Francisco	United States	The Warfield	20,000
July 27	Seattle	United States	Showbox Sodo	20,000
July 30	Dallas	United States	The Factory in Deep Ellum	20,000
August 1	Houston	United States	The Hobby Center	20,000
August 3	Chicago	United States	Radius	20,000
August 5 (Note: The concert on August 5, 2022, was originally set to take place at Webster Hall due to high demand.)	New York	United States	Terminal 5	20,000
August 7	Atlanta	United States	Cobb Energy Centre	20,000
August 10	Santiago	Chile	Teatro Caupolicán	10,000
August 12 (Note: The concert on August 12, 2022, was originally set to take place at Auditorio BB due to high demand.)	Mexico City	Mexico	Pepsi Center WTC	10,000
August 14	Monterrey	Mexico	Showcenter Complex	10,000
August 20	Bangkok	Thailand	Thunder Dome	4,000
August 27	Jakarta	Indonesia	The Kasablanka	4,000
September 9	Kuala Lumpur	Malaysia	Zepp Kuala Lumpur	4,500
September 11	Quezon City	Philippines	New Frontier Theater	5,000
September 16	Tokyo	Japan	Toyosu Pit	2,500
September 17	Tokyo	Japan	Toyosu Pit	2,500
October 1	Singapore		The Star Performing Arts Centre	4,000
Total				65.000

== Personnel ==
Artists

- (G)I-dle
  - Miyeon
  - Minnie
  - Soyeon
  - Yuqi
  - Shuhua

Band

- Shin Ye-chan (Keyboard)
- Lee Sang-min (Drums)
- Choi In-sung (Bass)
- Dongmin (Guitar)

Dancers

- Star System
  - Bang Min-ju
  - Kim Ji-young
  - Lee Dong-ha
  - Han Ji-won
  - Kim Min-ju
  - So Hyun
  - Lee Kyung-jin
  - Kim Da-in

Tour organizers

- Cube Entertainment
- CJ ENM

Tour promoter

- ACO Media & Hitman Solutions (MY)
- Be Here Now KPOP (TH)
- Ninshi Entertainment (South America)
- OneProduction (SG)
- Pia Corporation (JP)
- Powerhouse Live (North America)

Ticketing partners

- Interpark (KR)
- Live Nation (SG)
- Mecimapro (ID)
- SuperBoletos (Monterrey)
- Thaiticketmajor (TH)
- Ticketmaster (North America, South America)
- Ticket2U (MY)

== Gallery ==
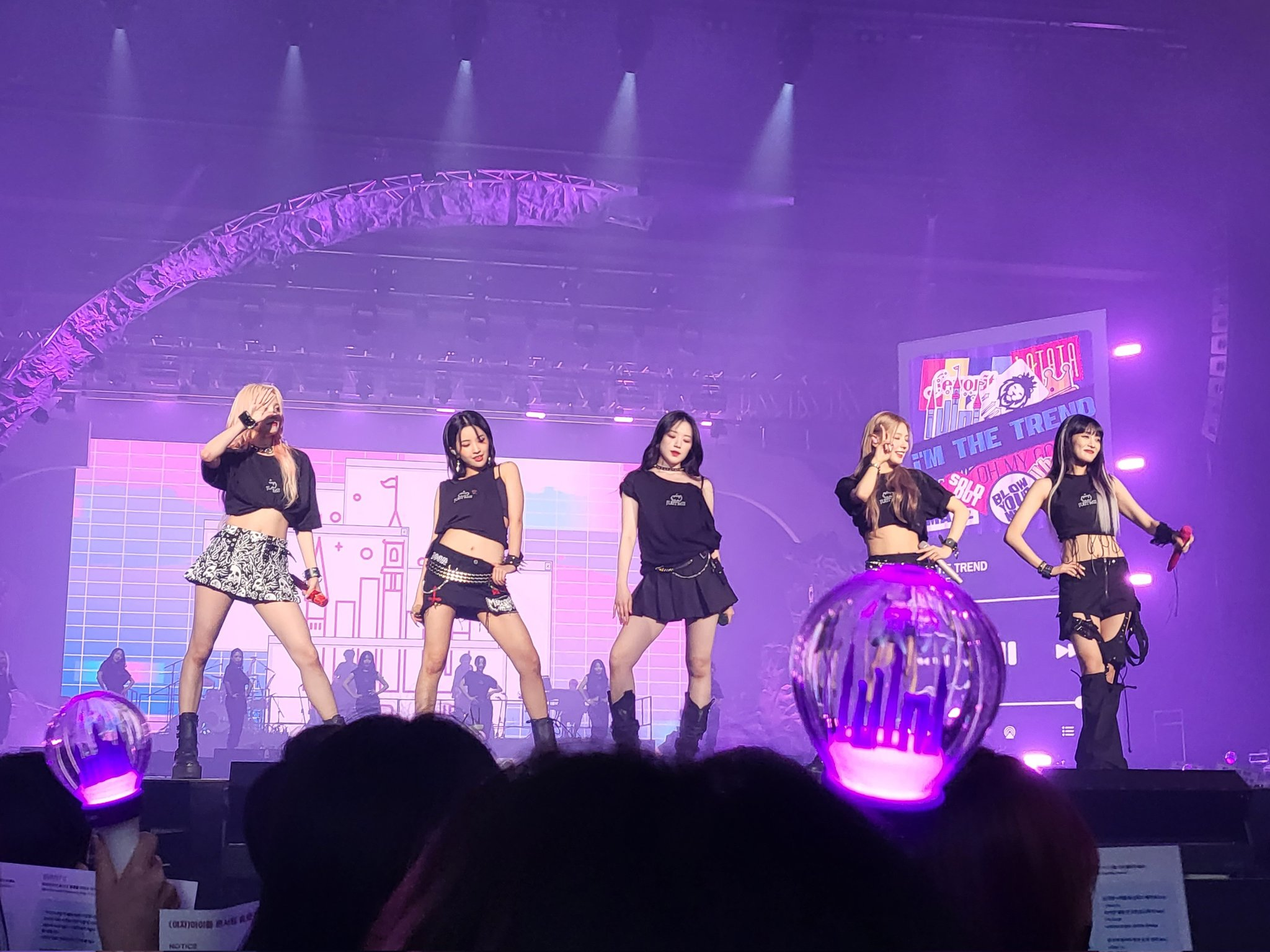
(G)I-dle performing "I'm the Trend" at their Seoul, South Korea concert on June 17.

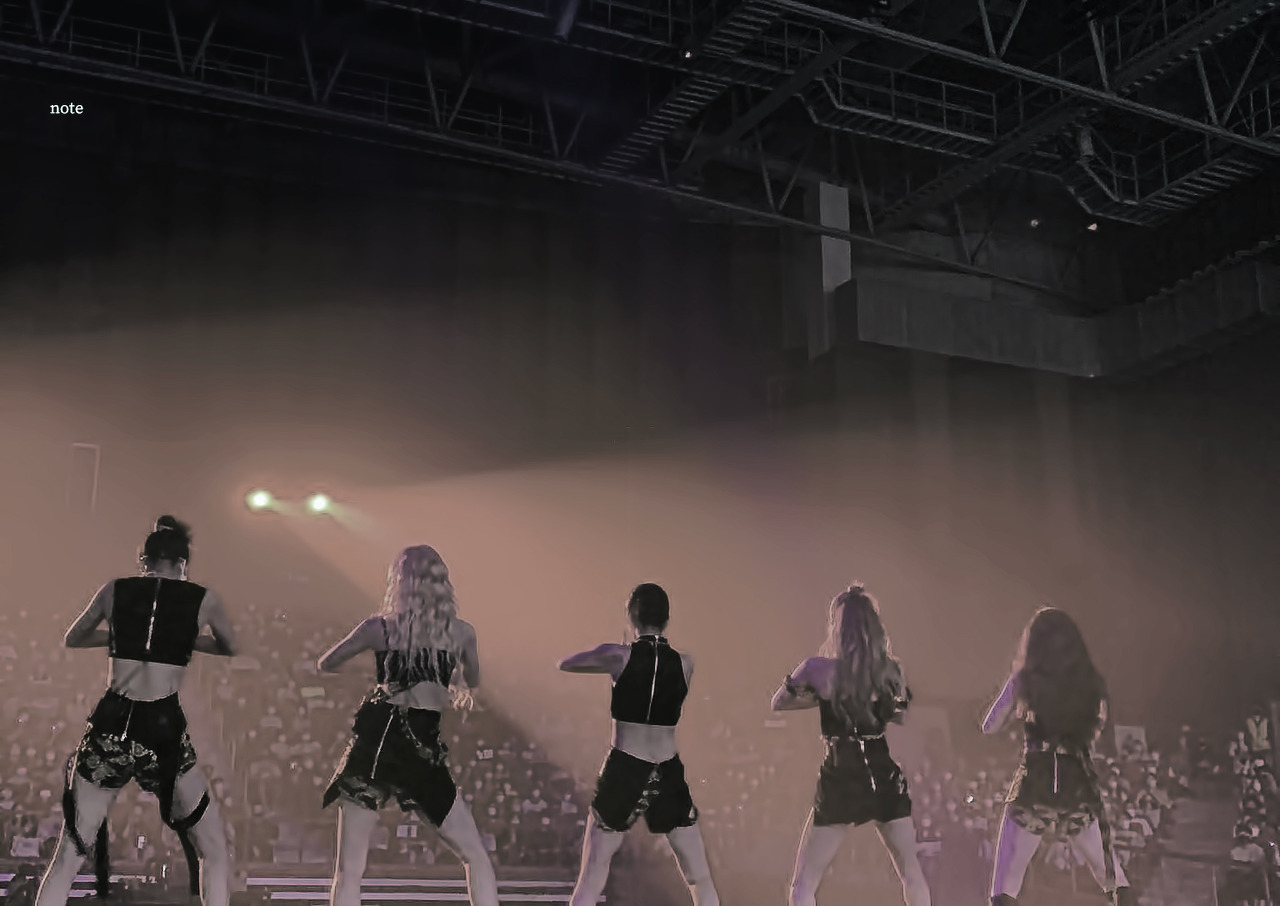
(G)I-dle in all-black outfits for the theme HEROiNE: Cliché.

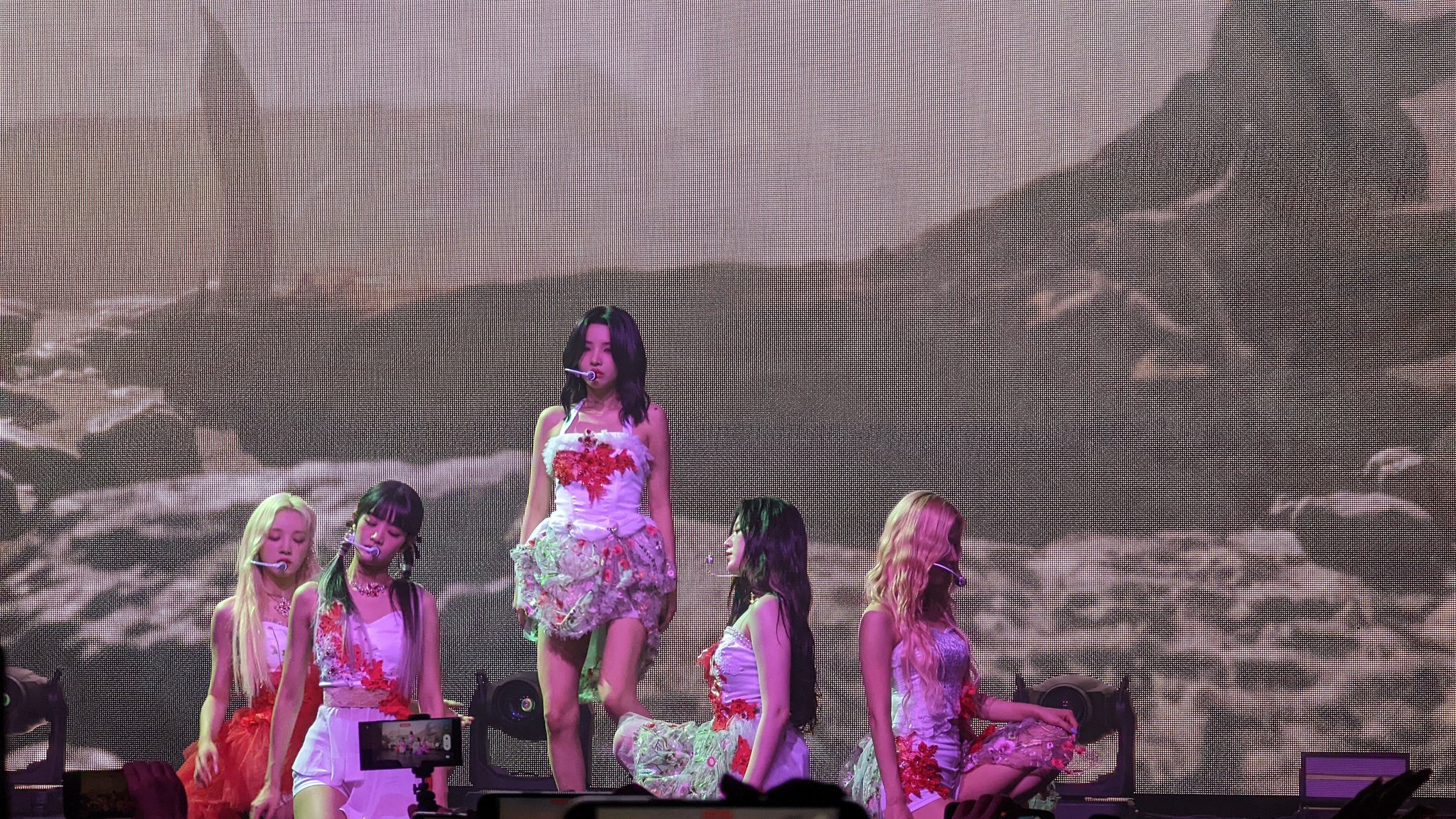
(G)I-dle in floral dresses incorporated with traditional Korean folk motif outfits for the theme a tragic HEROiNE.

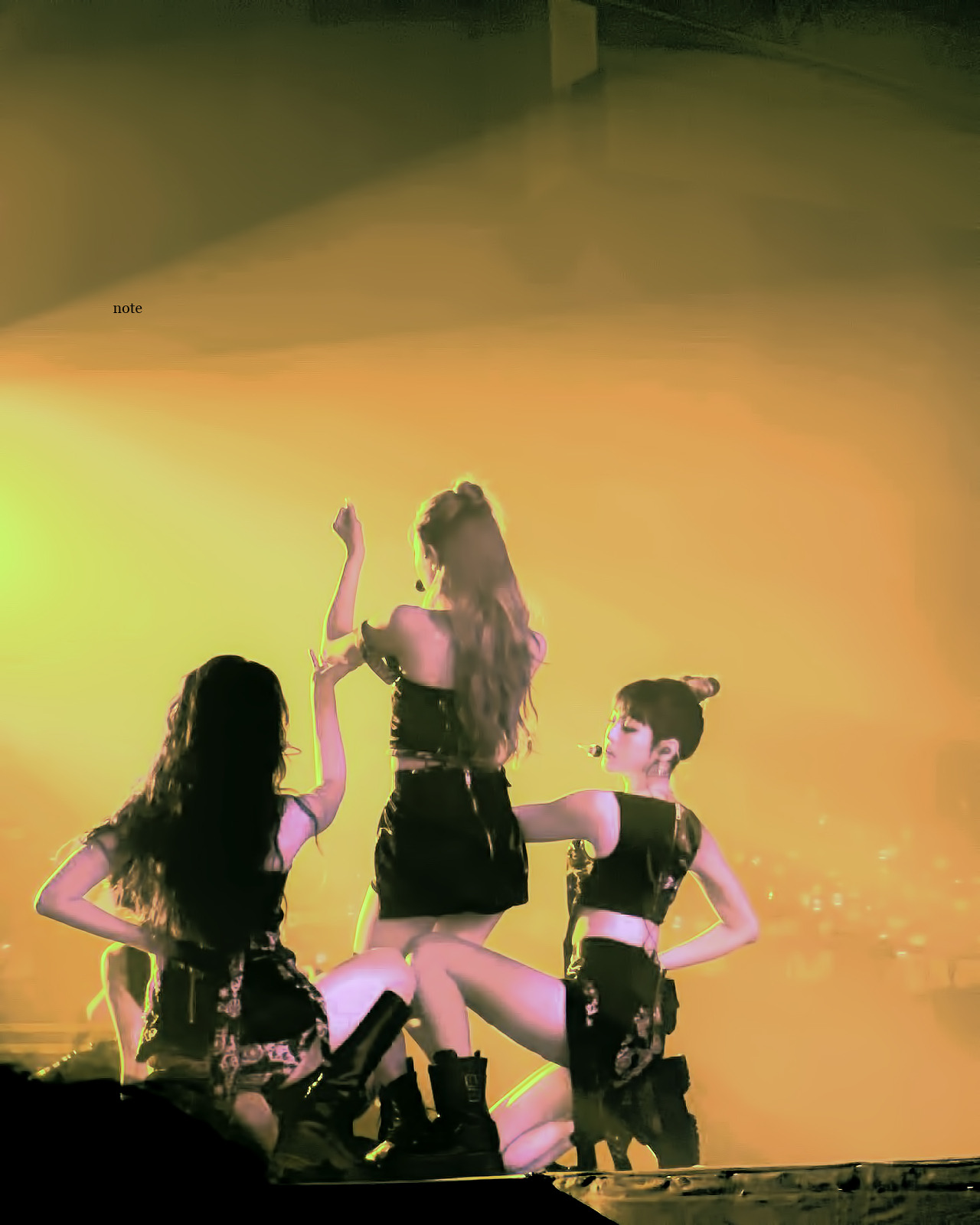
(G)I-dle performing "Latata" at their Seoul, South Korea concert on June 18.

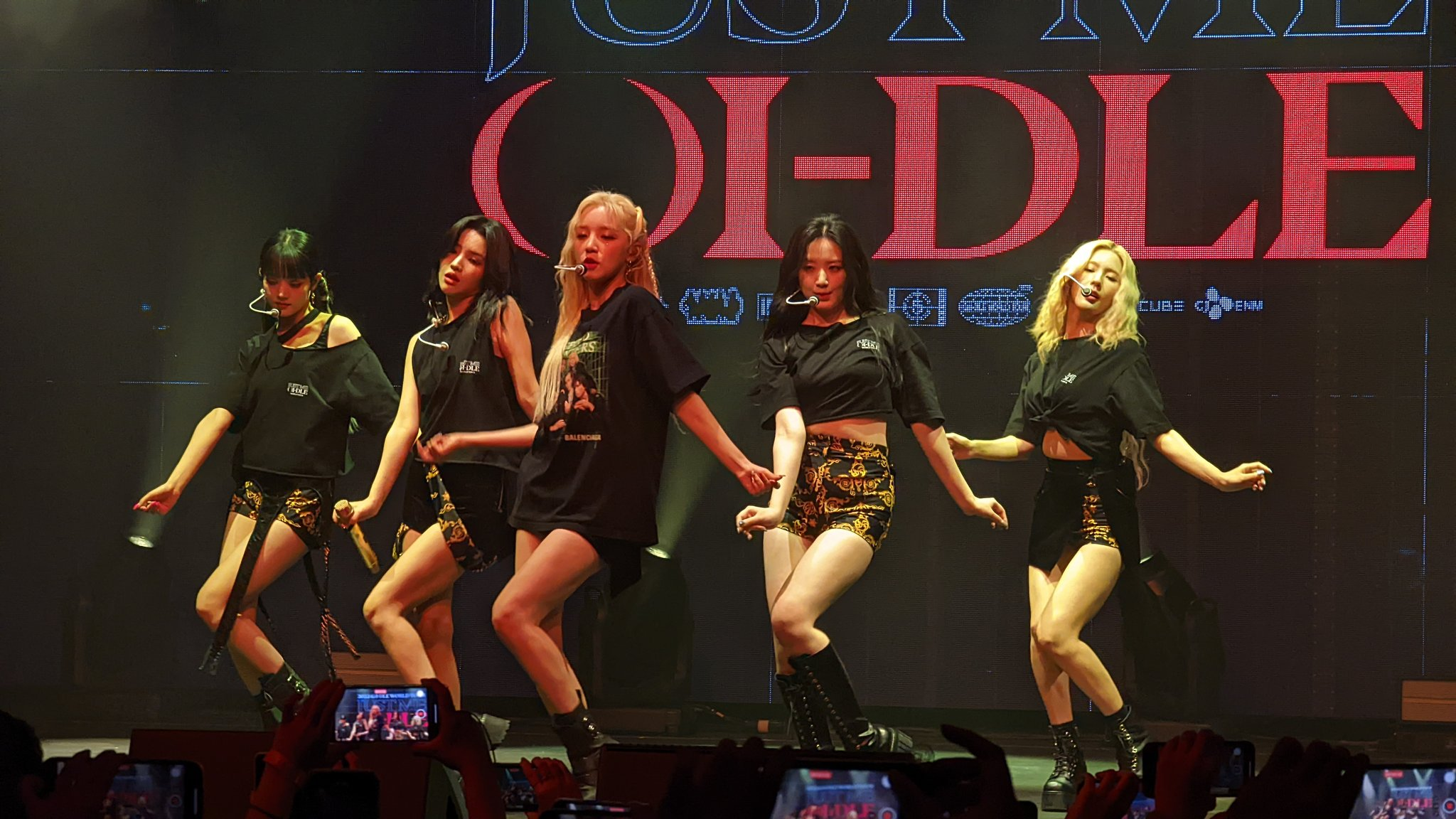
(G)I-dle performing "Senorita" during soundcheck at their San Francisco, U.S. concert on July 24.

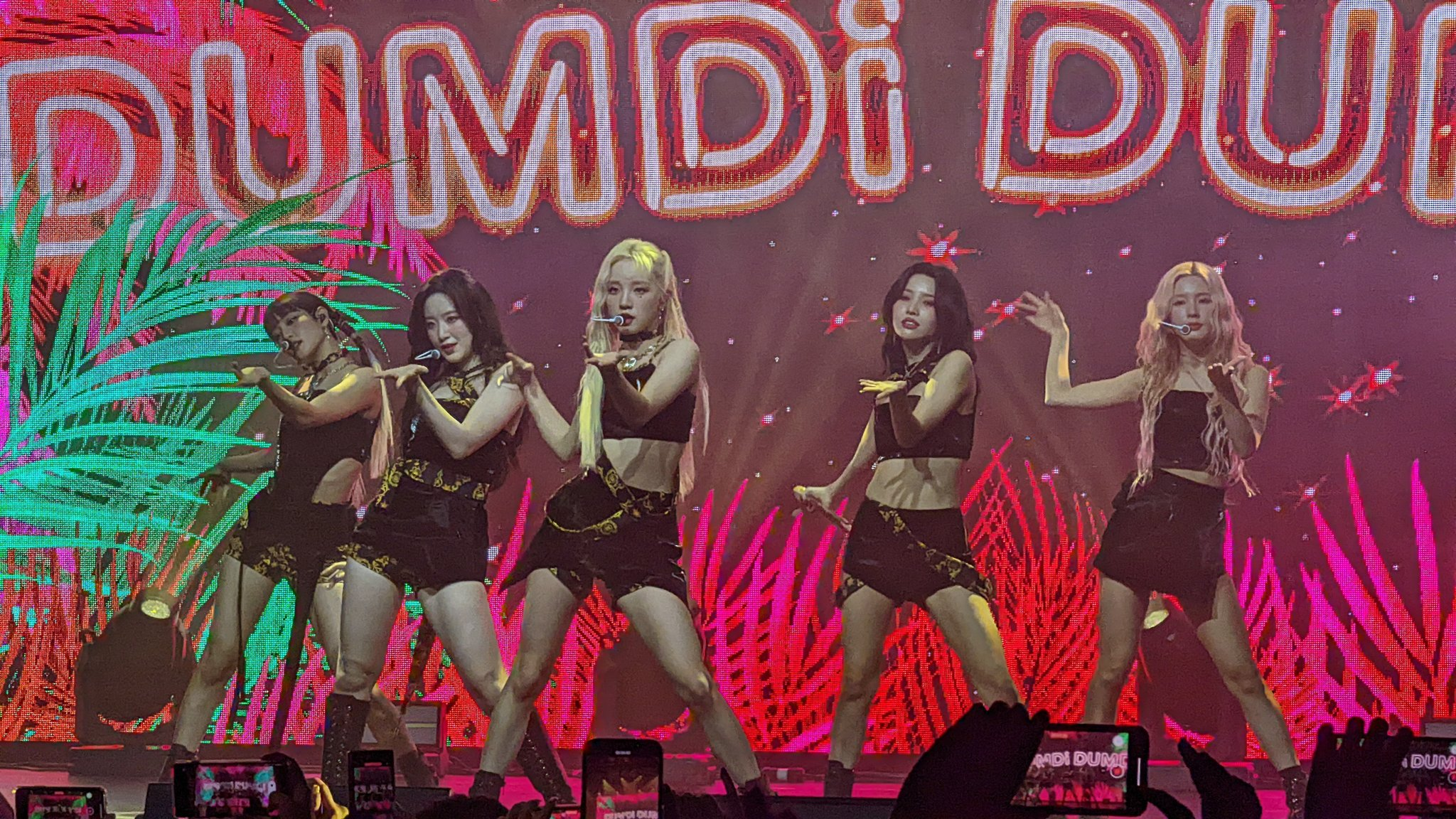
(G)I-dle performing "Dumdi Dumdi" at their San Francisco, U.S. concert on July 24.

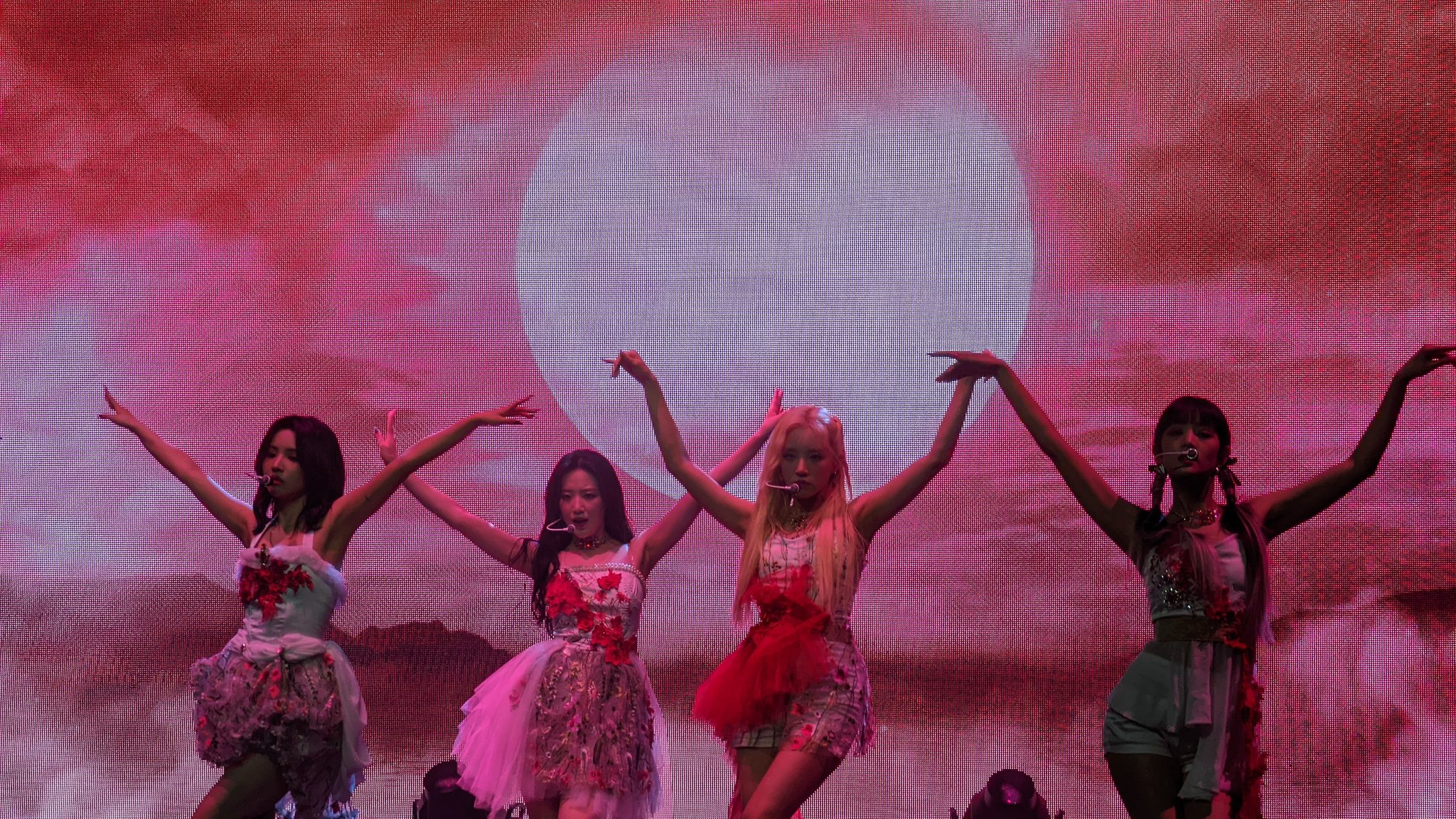
A large moon served as the backdrop during a tragic HEROiNE segment.

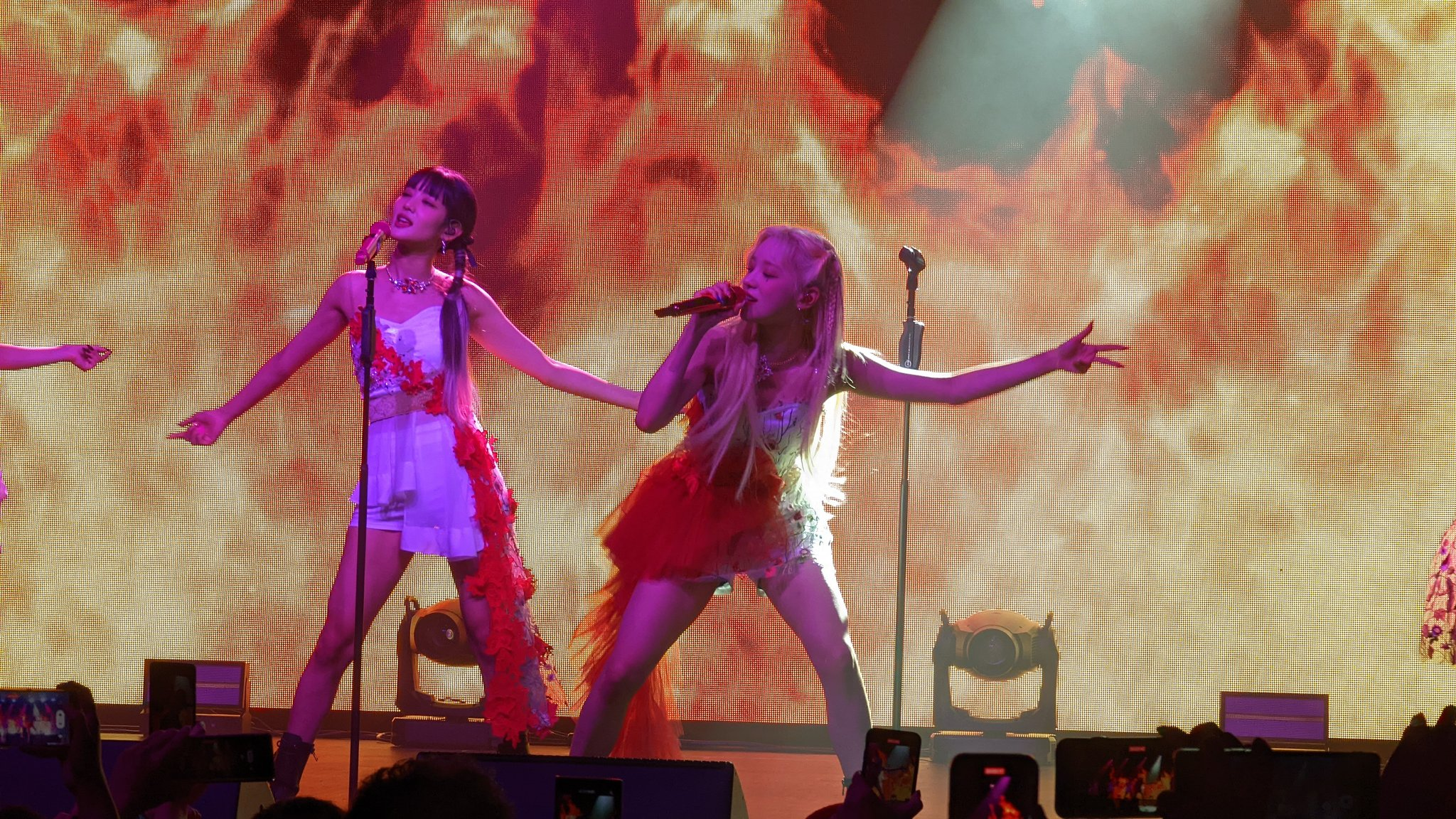
Minnie and Yuqi performed using a standing microphone during "Liar".

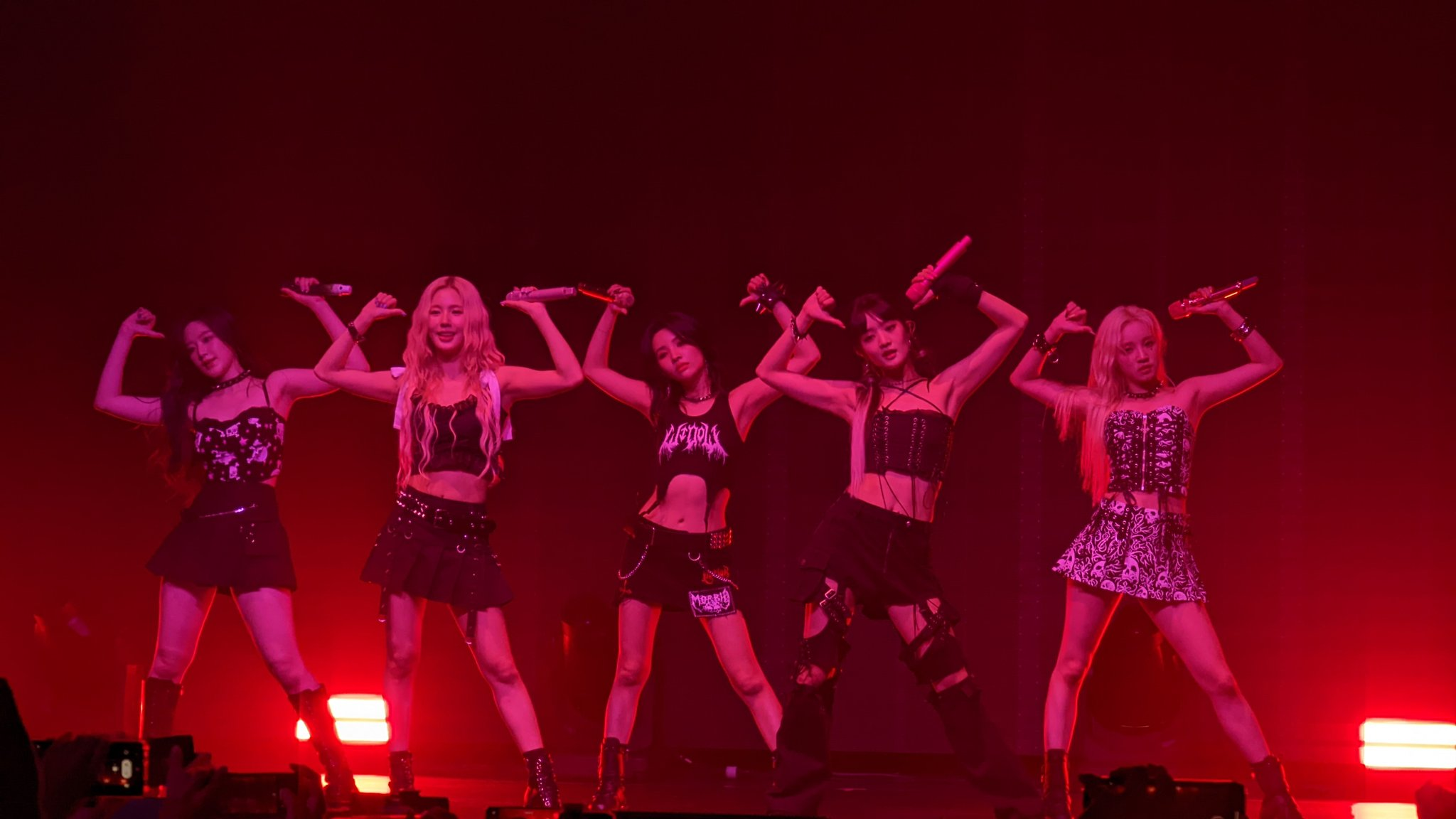
(G)I-dle performing "Tomboy" at their San Francisco, U.S. concert on July 24

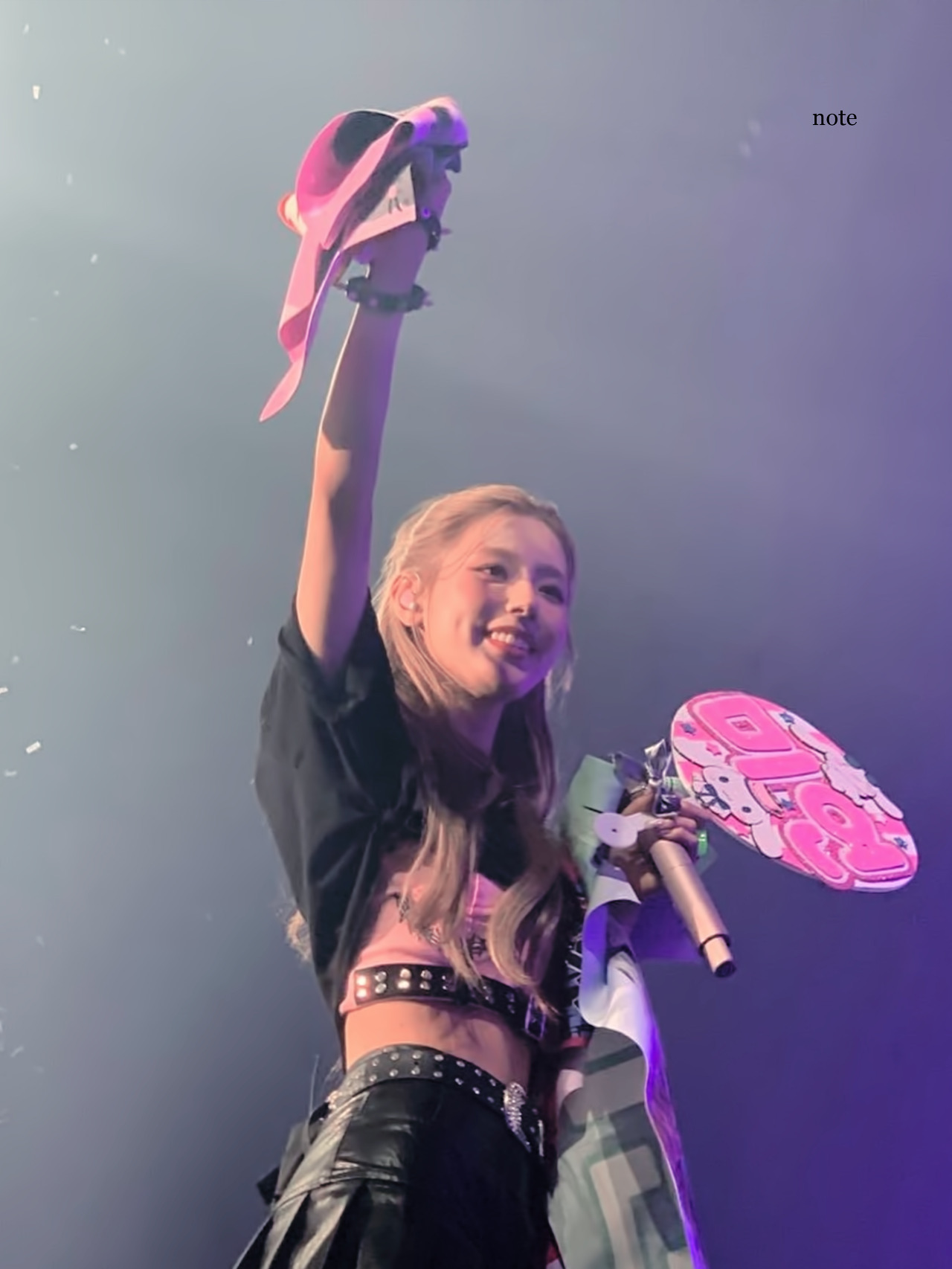
Miyeon holding fan gifts and banners during encore.
