= I Never Die =

- Digital cover

Studio album by (G)I-dle
- Released: March 14, 2022
- Studios: Cube Studio; Ingrid Studio
- Genres: Pop; alternative rock; R&B; hip-hop
- Length: 24:36
- Languages: Korean; English
- Labels: Cube; Kakao

(G)I-dle chronology
I Burn (2021)	I Never Die (2022)	I Love (2022)

Singles from I Never Die
- 1. "Tomboy" Released: March 14, 2022

I Never Die (stylized in all caps) is the first studio album by South Korean girl group (G)I-dle. It was released digitally on March 14, 2022, and physically the following day, by Cube Entertainment. It consists of three physical versions: RiSKY, CHiLL and SPOiLED, and contains eight tracks, including the lead single "Tomboy". The album marks the group's first release as a quintet following the departure of member Soojin in August 2021, and the fifth release in the 'I' series, following I Burn (2021). Members Soyeon, Minnie, and Yuqi served as the album's primary producers and songwriters.

Lyrically, the album focuses on speaking out against prejudices, exuding self-confidence, embracing one's own darker self, self-healing, and the feelings after breakups. Musically, it's an alternative rock, pop, R&B, and hip-hop record that experiments with rock, 2000s emo-teen, classic rock, and electro-pop sounds, with its songs characterized by a wide range of upbeat instruments such as electric guitar and drums.

I Never Die received generally favorable reviews from music critics, who complimented its cohesiveness, concept, art direction, rock production, and lyrical themes, as well as the group's musical growth. However, criticism was made over the album's short length. Domestically, it was a commercial success, debuting at number two on the Circle Album Chart with over 200,000 copies sold in its first week. Additionally, it was certified double-platinum by Korean Music Content Association. In China, the album became the second best-selling album by a K-pop act in 2022 after Born Pink, with over 560,000 digital units sold.

The album was released on the same day as the lead single "Tomboy", which reached number one on both the Circle Digital Chart and K-pop Hot 100. The single managed to stay in the top ten on the said charts for multiple weeks. (G)I-dle performed other tracks "My Bag" and "Villain Dies", alongside the lead single, on South Korean music program M Countdown and live on 2022 MAMA Awards, 2022 Melon Music Awards and 37th Golden Disc Awards. In support of the album, the group embarked on Just Me ( )I-dle World Tour in 2022.

== Background and release ==
In January 2021, the group released their fourth extended play I Burn, which detailed the various emotions experienced during the process of finding happiness after separation. It received generally positive reviews from contemporary critics. It debuted at number three on the Gaon Album Chart, becoming the group's fifth top ten album in the country, and scored their best opening-week sales, selling 115,500 copies. The EP also marked as their final release as a sextet before Soojin's hiatus and subsequent departure from the group in August 2021.

In an interview with E-Daily, Miyeon revealed that (G)I-dle might be promoting as a group "sooner than fans expect" and that they "will show you lots of new and cool sides of ourselves this year". On February 17, 2022 Cube Entertainment stated that the group was preparing to release new music in March. On February 24, 2022, the label announced that (G)I-dle would be releasing their first studio album, titled I Never Die, on March 14. On February 25, a black-and-white comeback trailer was released. On February 28, the track listing was revealed, with "Tomboy" announced as the lead single, followed by a lyric poster on March 1. Concept photos were released on March 2, 3 and 4. An audio snippet was published on March 7, with music video teasers on March 11 and 12. I Never Die was released worldwide on March 14, 2022, through Cube Entertainment, in conjunction with a music video for "Tomboy".

== Composition ==
=== Music and lyrics ===
The standard edition of I Never Die is twenty-four minutes long, consisting of eight tracks. The CD adds an explicit version of "Tomboy". The majority of the album, including the lead single, was co-written and produced by member Soyeon. Yuqi participated in the creation of "Liar" and "Polaroid", while Minnie contributed to "Already" and "Escape". I Never Die is primarily a pop, alternative rock, rock, R&B, and hip-hop record with influences of rock. The album focuses on speaking out against prejudices and exuding self-confidence.

I wanted to show the spirit and determination of the (G)I-dle through the album name itself. It contains our feelings and thoughts about all the prejudices in the world and I thought about how the five of us, who have grown up, should look like. I wanted to make an album that proves our worth.

— Soyeon, Naver.

=== Songs ===
The opening track "Tomboy" is a grimy, empowering alternative rock, rock and pop-punk song about independence and breaking the "perfect girlfriend" stereotype. The track is set to reverberating guitar riffs and drum beats with lyrics such as "I'm not a doll", and "Just me I-DLE". "Never Stop Me" is a rock-leaning song with 2000s emo-teen influences that expresses the feelings of a breakup. In the third track "Villain Dies", the group "proudly embrace their darker side". It is a dark electro-pop song that also combines hip-hop and rock with "ominous" violin. "Already" is a soft R&B and pop acknowledgement song that just "because there's been healing, [it] doesn’t mean [that] the scars have disappeared altogether". The fifth track "Polaroid" is a mesmerizing and nostalgic R&B song with a heartwarming message about (G)I-dle's desire to live in the moment and capture their youth in their memories like they would capture something in a polaroid photo. "Escape" was made for "those who become tired of everything and feel like giving up, as this will provide warm consolation and care". "Liar" is a classic rock song with electric guitar. It presents the "spirited act" of the group standing up for themselves and realizing that it is better to let a bad thing go. The "bombastic" and "proud" closing track "My Bag" is a climactic song where all members show off their rapping prowess against a hip-hop instrumental.

== Critical reception ==
Professional ratings
Review scores
Source	Rating
Genius	4.5/5 stars
IZM	3/5 stars
NME	4/5 stars
The Kraze	10/10

I. Raj Tanu of NME give the album four stars out of five, praising the "cohesive narrative about becoming your own person", the group's usage of various genres, and their overall growth writing, "it may be their 'first' full-length album, but it is almost poetic how it proverbially culminates the story of this woman. She's bloomed into her own. She's meandered through adversity and self-doubt to be born anew – and this new avatar is here to stay." Tanu further elaborated: "I Never Die is less of a proclamation and more of an assurance for (G)I-dle themselves – peel away the bravado, gumption and even the wondrous layers, and you'll find a simple promise: no matter what, they will always make it through, and they will always be here."

IZM's Yeom Dong-gyo proclaimed it as an "album that gives persuasive power to a solid concept", praising the album's "colorful style", its direction, vision, the "powerful" rock production, and "the lyrics that support the album's theme". However, he criticizes the album's short length.

Genius's Maddison Murray wrote, "I Never Die is (G)I-dle at their strongest and most incredible to date, exploring a range of concepts while still staying cohesive and true to the group’s vision. Minnie, Miyeon, Soyeon, Shuhua, and Yuqi get to show off their impeccable talents in ways unlike Neverland [the group's fandom] has ever seen before, and the result is a beautiful album that fans will cherish for years to come. Heading into the fifth year of their career, it’s more clear than ever that (G)I-dle are industry frontrunners who will continue to push themselves into new territory with experimental sounds, introspective lyrics, and performances like the world has never seen. Their confidence, reign on the charts, and impact on fans globally will never die."

Time's Kat Moon praised the overall production and lyrics writing, "Across eight tracks, (G)I-dle impresses not just with performance but with production: every song has credits from Soyeon, Minnie, or Yuqi. And while the group begins to challenge stereotypes in the lead single "Tomboy"—where they refuse to become a "blond barbie doll" to meet societal standards—(G)I-dle builds upon the rebellious energy in the tracks that follow. The album takes a more gentle turn from "Already to "Escape" before shifting back to the hard and heavy through the rock-leaning "Liar." But the final number "My Bag," a propulsive hip hop-infused banger featuring all five members rapping, is the project's standout."

=== Year-end lists ===
Year-end lists for I Never Die
Critic/Publication	List	Rank	Note(s)	Ref.
Time	The Best K-Pop Songs and Albums of 2022	Placed	I Never Die	
Idology	20 Best K-Pop Albums Of 2022	Placed	I Never Die	
The Vector	The Best 20 K-pop Songs of 2022	14	"Villain Dies"	

== Artwork and packaging ==
The physical album was released in three versions with three concepts: RiSKY, CHiLL, and SPOiLED version. In RiSKY version the group shows "a very close noir concept"; in CHiLL, they portrays "relaxed and cool revenge squad concept"; while in SPOiLED version, the group "expresses a protagonist who you can’t hate even though it’s arbit". The album comes with a CD, photobook, lyric paper, sticker, secret pocket, photo evidence 1 and 2, photocard, and mini poster.

== Promotion ==
On February 24, 2022, Cube Entertainment announced on their social media accounts that the group would be releasing their first studio album titled I Never Die on March 14. Preorders for the album began the same day. On February 28, the group revealed the album's track listing, with "Tomboy" as the lead single of the album. On March 8, 2022, (G)I-dle released a one-minute-long video for the track "My Bag", where they are accompanied by a team of backup dancers in the middle of an empty road, racing in flashy white sports cars. I Never Die was released on March 14, 2022, to retail stores, digital music and streaming platforms, as well as on the band's website. Prior to the album's release, on March 14, 2022, the group held an online showcase event to introduce the album, communicate with their fans and perform songs from I Never Die. The group performed "Tomboy" on Mnet's M Countdown on March 17, KBS's Music Bank on March 18, MBC's Show! Music Core on March 19, and SBS's Inkigayo on March 20. On May of the same year, Cube confirmed that the group would embark on their 3rd world tour Just Me ( )I-dle In support of the album, with the first leg kicking off on June 18, at the Olympic Hall in Seoul, South Korea.

== Accolades ==
Awards and nominations
Organization	Year	Category	Result	Ref.
Asian Pop Music Awards	2022	Best Group (Overseas)	Won	
Asian Pop Music Awards	2022	Top 20 Albums of the Year (Overseas)	Won	
Asian Pop Music Awards	2022	People's Choice Award (Overseas)	2nd place	
Genie Music Awards	2022	Album of the Year	Nominated	
Melon Music Awards	2022	Album of the Year	Nominated	
Korean Music Awards	2023	Best K-Pop Album	Nominated	
Seoul Music Awards	2023	Bonsang Award	Won	
Circle Chart Music Awards	2023	Album Production of the Year	Won	

== Track listing ==
I Never Die track listing
No.	Title	Lyrics	Music	Arrangement	Length
1.	"Tomboy"	Soyeon	Soyeon; Pop Time; Jenci	Pop Time; Jenci; Soyeon	2:55
2.	"Never Stop Me" (Korean: 말리지 마; RR: Malliji ma)	Soyeon	Soyeon; Kako; Pop Time	Pop Time; Kako	2:25
3.	"Villain Dies"	Soyeon	Soyeon; The Proof	The Proof	3:05
4.	"Already"	Minnie; Houdini; Soyeon	Minnie; Houdini	Houdini; Minnie	3:25
5.	"Polaroid"	Yuqi; Boytoy (Blatinum); PLZ (Blatinum)	Yuqi; Boytoy (Blatinum); PLZ (Blatinum)	Yuqi; Boytoy (Blatinum); PLZ (Blatinum)	3:40
6.	"Escape"	Minnie; BreadBeat; Soyeon	BreadBeat; Minnie	BreadBeat	3:30
7.	"Liar"	Yuqi; Siixk Jun; Soyeon	Yuqi; Siixk Jun; Kim Myong-kyu	Siixk June; Kim Myong-kyu	2:55
8.	"My Bag"	Soyeon	Soyeon; Nathan	Nathan; Flip_00	2:41
Total length:					24:36

CD only bonus track
No.	Title	Lyrics	Music	Arrangement	Length
9.	"Tomboy" (explicit)	Soyeon	Soyeon; Pop Time; Jenci	Pop Time; Jenci; Soyeon	2:55
Total length:					27:31

== Credits and personnel ==
Credits adapted from album liner notes.

Musicians

- (G)I-dle – vocals (all tracks)
  - Soyeon – background vocals (track 1, 2, 8, 9), lyrics (except track 5), composition (tracks 1, 2, 3, 8), arrangement (track 1, 9),
  - Minnie – composition (tracks 4, 6), arrangement (tracks 4, 6), background vocal (track 4, 6)
  - Yuqi – composition (tracks 5 and 7), arrangement (track 5), background vocal (track 4)
- Pop Time – composition (track 1, 2, 9), arrangement (track 1, 2, 9)
- Jenci – composition (track 1, 9), arrangement (track 1, 9), background vocal (track 1, 2, 9), keyboard (track 1, 9)
- Kako – composition (track 2), arrangement (track 2), background vocal (track 2)
- The Proof – composition (track 3), arrangement (track 3), drum (track 3), synthesizer (track 3)
- Houdini – composition (track 4), arrangement (track 4), background vocal (track 4), guitar (track 4), bass (track 4), drum programming (track 4), keyboard (track 4)
- Boytoy (Blatinum) – lyrics (track 5), composition (track 5), arrangement (track 5), bass (track 5)
- PLZ (Blatinum) – lyrics (track 5), composition (track 5), arrangement (track 5)
- BreadBeat – lyrics (track 6), composition (track 6), arrangement (track 6), piano (track 6), synthesizer (track 6)
- Siixk Jun – lyrics (track 7), composition (track 7), arrangement (track 7), piano (track 7)
- Kim Myong-kyu – composition (track 7), arrangement (track 7), guitar (track 7), bass (track 7)
- Nathan – composition (track 8), keyboard (track 8)
- Flip_00 – arrangement (track 8), drum (track 8)
- Jeon Jae-hee – background vocal (track 1, 8, 9)
- Lee So-hyun – background vocal (track 5)
- Perrie – background vocal (track 5)
- Kim Ho-hyun – guitar (track 1, 2, 9)
- EOMT – guitar (track 3)
- Kim Myung-gyu – guitar (track 6)
- Lim Hyunqi – acoustic guitar (track 5)
- Lee Ji-ho – electric guitar (track 5)
- Park Ji-young – keyboard (track 1, 2, 9)
- Kim So-hoon – keyboard (track 5)
- Oh Song-ji – keyboard (track 5)
- Kim Mi-geum – keyboard (track 5)
- Choi In-seong – bass (track 1, 2, 9)
- Yang Chae-ni – piano (track 3)
- Kim Seung-nam – drum (track 5)
- Baek Min-sung – drum (track 5)

Technical

- Yang Young-eun – recording (tracks 1, 2, 9)
- Choi Ye-ji – recording (tracks 1, 2, 3, 4, 8, 9)
- Shin Jae-bin – recording (track 5, 6, 7), mixing (track 5, 6, 7)
- Jung Eun-kyung – digital editing (tracks 1, 2, 9)
- Kang Seon-young – mix engineering (tracks 1, 2, 9)
- Koo Jong-pil – mixing (track 1, 2, 9)
- Anchor – mixing (track 3, 8)
- Kim Dae-sung – mixing (track 4)
- Kwon Nam-woo – mastering (all tracks)
- Yoo Eun-jin – assistant mastering (all tracks)

Locations

- Ingrid Studio – recording (track 1, 2, 9), digital editing (track 1, 2, 9)
- Cube Studio – recording (all tracks), mixing (track 5, 6, 7)
- Klang Studio – mixing (track 1, 2, 9)
- Prismfilter Mix Lab – mixing (track 3, 8)
- Tone Studio Seoul – mixing (track 4)
- 821 Sound mastering – mastering (all tracks), assistant mastering (all tracks)

== Charts ==
=== Weekly charts ===
Chart performance for I Never Die
Chart (2022)	Peak position
Australian Hitseekers Albums (ARIA)	19
Finnish Physical Albums (Suomen virallinen lista)	9
French Physical Albums (SNEP)	85
German Albums (Offizielle Top 100)	83
Japanese Albums (Oricon)	68
South Korean Albums (Gaon)	2
UK Album Downloads (Official Charts)	72
US World Albums (Billboard)	13

=== Monthly charts ===
Monthly chart performance for I Never Die
Chart (2022)	Peak position
South Korean Albums (Gaon)	5

=== Year-end charts ===
Year-end chart performance for I Never Die
Chart (2022)	Position
South Korean Albums (Circle)	49

== Certifications and sales ==
Region	Certification	Certified units/sales
South Korea (KMCA)	Platinum	274,958

== Release history ==
Release history for I Never Die
Region	Date	Format	Label
South Korea	March 14, 2022	CD	Cube; Kakao
Various	March 14, 2022	Digital download; streaming	Cube
