= My Bag =

2022 song by (G)I-dle

Song by (G)I-dle

from the album I Never Die
- Released: March 14, 2022
- Studio: Cube Studio
- Genre: Hip hop
- Length: 2:40
- Label: Cube; Kakao
- Songwriter: Soyeon
- Producers: Soyeon; Nathan

Track Video
- "My Bag" on YouTube

"My Bag" (stylized in all caps) is a song by South Korean girl group (G)I-dle for their first studio album, I Never Die released on March 14, 2022, as the eight-track on the album. Written by Soyeon and co-produced by Nathan, the song's musical style focuses on the rap by all members of (G)I-dle as Soyeon commented the song "[is] something that only (G)I-dle can do". A part of the song interpolates elements from their previous singles "Latata," "Hann (Alone)," "Senorita," "Dumdi Dumdi," and "Hwaa".

== Background and composition ==
On February 17, 2022, Cube Entertainment announced that (G)I-dle will be making a comeback in March about a year and two months since I Burn released in January 2021, and is preparing for a new album. On February 24, it was reported that the group will be releasing their debut studio album, I Never Die on March 14 digitally. "My Bag" was written and composed by Soyeon, with additional composition credits by Nathan and Flip_00. (G)I-dle's Shuhua said the song is the album's "special song" and shared: "I did rap and that made me want to be a cool rapper like Soyeon. I want to learn from her."

"I tried to bring out the individuality of the members as they always did. I wrote the lyrics for "My Bag" to fit each person's image. I directed them so that they could show their stories as if they were their own."

— Soyeon on writing "My Bag"

"My Bag" is a hip-hop track that has a strong bass accompanied by catchy Korean rhymes. In terms of musical notation, the song is composed in the key of G-sharp minor, with a tempo of 94 beats per minute, and runs for two minutes and forty seconds.

== Critical reception ==
Tanu I. Raj of NME stated that "My Bag" is "bombastic and proud" as the song fits (G)I-dle, further describing the song "falls prey to hyperbolic and outdated hip-hop trappings – flexing wealth can only be so fresh – the neat arrangement balances it out". Writing for Genius, Addison Murray labelled the track as a "flex anthem" and noted the track's similarity to their debut track "Latata" commenting that "they're celebrating their past achievements while flaunting their current success". Sofia Gomez from The Kraze describe that the song when it "plays on your speakers, this is the moment to have fun and enjoy the vibey hip-hop track that will be liked by many for its eccentric style."

Year-end lists for "My Bag"
Critic/Publication	List	Rank	Note	Ref.
MTV	The 22 Best K-Pop B-Sides Of 2022	13	Song	

== Commercial performance ==
"My Bag" debuted at position 116 on South Korea's Gaon Digital Chart in the chart issue dated March 13–19, 2022. The song then ascended to position 79 in the chart issue dated March 20–26, 2022, and debuted at position 74 on Billboard K-pop Hot 100.

== Live performance ==
As part of the album promotion, on their first promotion week, "My Bag" was performed along with the title track on M Countdown, which aired on March 17, 2022.

== Promotion ==
Prior to the album's release, on February 26, 2022, Cube released the album scheduler, which hinted 'What's in My Bag?' on March 8, 2022. Later, it was revealed a track video was released on the group's official YouTube channel. It showed (G)I-dle racing in supercars and a powerful group dance to the rap lyrics of "My Bag". On March 14, 2022, (G)I-dle held a live event called "(G)I-dle 1st Full Album [I Never Die] GV_CINEMATIC LiVE" on YouTube to introduce the album and its songs, including "My Bag". A choreography video for the song was released on March 28, 2022.

== Trivia ==
(G)I-DLE member MINNIE once mentioned on a show that she and her family were mistakenly perceived by the public as "Thai billionaires." This speculation arose after she shared photos of her parents' house in Thailand on social media, leading many to assume she came from an upper-class background. However, in a February 2024 episode of the YouTube show 씨유튜브, MINNIE clarified that while her family was financially comfortable, "My parents didn’t fully support me, and I never spent their money."

Additionally, in MY BAG, MINNIE's verse includes references to wealth and luxury, prompting some fans to jokingly call her a "real-life billionaire." In response, she explained, "The lyrics were written by Jeon Soyeon—it’s just part of the performance and doesn’t reflect my real life." She then jokingly added, "Honestly, I need money too!"

== Credits and personnel ==
Credits are adapted from Cube Entertainment, and NetEase Music.

- (G)I-dle – Vocals
  - Soyeon – Producer, songwriter, background vocal
- Nathan – Producer, audio engineer, keyboard
- Flip_00 – Audio engineer, drum,
- Jeon Jae-hee – background vocal
- Choi Ye-ji (Cube Studio) – Record engineering
- Anchor (Prismfilter Mix Lab) – audio mixing
- Kwon Nam-woo (821 Sound mastering) – Audio mastering
- Jang Seung-ho (821 Sound mastering) – Assistant audio mastering

== Charts ==
=== Weekly charts ===
Weekly chart performance for "My Bag"
Chart (2022)	Peak position
Singapore Top Regional (RIAS)	24
South Korea (Gaon)	22
South Korea (K-pop Hot 100)	34
South Korea (Billboard)	9

=== Monthly charts ===
Monthly chart performance for "My Bag"
Chart (2022)	Position
South Korea (Gaon)	23

=== Year-end charts ===
Year-end chart performance for "My Bag"
Chart (2022)	Position
South Korea (Circle)	61
