= Tomboy ((G)I-dle song) =

"Tomboy"
- R3hab remix cover

Single by (G)I-dle

from the album I Never Die
- Language: Korean
- Released: March 14, 2022
- Recorded: Cube Studio; Ingrid Studio
- Genre: Alt-rock; pop punk
- Length: 2:55
- Label: Cube; Kakao
- Songwriters: Soyeon; Pop Time; Jenci
- Producer: Soyeon

(G)I-dle singles chronology
"Hwaa" (2021)	"Tomboy" (2022)	"Nxde" (2022)

Music video
- "Tomboy" on YouTube

"Tomboy" is a song recorded by South Korean girl group (G)I-dle for their first studio album I Never Die. It was released as the album's lead single by Cube Entertainment on March 14, 2022. The song marked the first release of (G)I-dle as a quintet following the departure of member Soojin in August 2021. It is an alt-rock and pop punk song that takes influence from rock music. It incorporates guitar riffs, drum beats, and lyrics that revolve around breaking the mold of being a perfect girlfriend.

"Tomboy" received positive reviews from several publications, which named it one of the best K-pop songs in 2022, as well as praising the song's production, lyrics, and message. It was commercially successful in South Korea, peaking at number one on the Gaon Digital Chart for multiple weeks. Additionally, it was certified platinum by the Korea Music Content Association after surpassing 100 million streams in the country.

== Background and release ==
On February 17, 2022, Cube Entertainment announced (G)I-dle would be releasing a new album in March 2022 as a five-member group after Soojin, who was embroiled in a school bullying controversy, departed in August 2021. On February 24, it was announced (G)I-dle would be releasing their first studio album I Never Die on March 14. Four days later, the album's track listing was released, with "Tomboy" confirmed as the lead single. On March 7, the audio teaser video was released. The music video teaser was released on March 11 and 12. On May 20, a remix version by R3hab was released.

== Composition ==
"Tomboy" was written by Soyeon, who also composed and arranged the song alongside Pop Time and Jenci. Soyeon cited the fictional character, Cruella de Vil, as the inspiration behind the song. Musically, it is a "grimy" alternative rock and pop punk song that is influenced by rock music. It is set to reverberating guitar riffs and drum beats with lyrics about "independent and breaking the mold [of] being a 'perfect girlfriend'". In terms of musical notation, the song was written in the key of C-sharp minor with a tempo of 124 beats per minute.

== Critical reception ==
Billboard named "Tomboy" the best K-pop song of 2022, praising the song's message, art direction, lyricism and production, writing: "the expletive-laced, punk sound of 'Tomboy' was more aggressive and grittier than anything fans had seen from the outfit to date...Instead of coming back with something safe or easy-listening, (G)I-dle moved ahead with a track that spoke to its core message of presenting the group's true selves". Similar to Billboard, Teen Vogue's Anton Rohr praised the song's punk production, message and lyrics. The Korea Herald's Hong Yoo named the song one of the highlights of 2022, writing, "(G)I-dle comes back for 'vengeance' after a yearlong hiatus with its megahit song 'Tomboy', a rebellious pop-rock song with an ear-catching melody and eye-catching choreography." He furthermore praised the hook for combining the "members' unique voices with a rough instrumental sound, and the addictive variation". The Telegraph's Nandini Chakrabarti wrote that "the lyrics connected with audiences worldwide and paved the way for the group to emerge from its downfall in 2021. Tomboy’s success and the punk vibe of the song pushed the group to even greater heights of recognition." IZM's So Seung-geun picked the song as one 2022's best songs, despite the challenges that the group faced after member Soojin's departure. He said the group's departure from their usual style helped them gain prominence in the girl group scene. He also noted that unlike other groups, (G)I-dle embraced pop punk, distinguishing themselves with the genre's infectious melodies and straightforward lyrics.

"Tomboy" on select critic rankings
Critic/Publication	List	Rank	Ref.
Billboard	The 25 Best K-pop Songs of 2022	1	
Dazed	The Best K-pop Tracks of 2022	14	
Idology	Top 20 Songs of 2022	No order	
IZM	Best Songs of 2022	No order	
Music Y	Top 10 Songs of 2022	5	
Rolling Stone	100 Greatest Songs in the History of Korean Pop Music	81	
SCMP	15 Best K-pop Songs of 2022	13	
Teen Vogue	The 79 Best K-pop Songs of 2022	No order	
Teen Vogue	21 Best K-pop Music Videos of 2022	No order	
The Korea Herald	2022 Highlights of K-pop	8	
Vogue Korea	6 Best Music Videos of the Year	No order	

== Commercial performance ==
"Tomboy" debuted at number two on South Korea's Gaon Digital Chart in the chart issue dated March 13–19, 2022, ascending to number one in the following week. On the Billboard K-pop Hot 100, the song debuted at number 21 in the chart issue dated March 20–26, 2022, ascending to number one in the following week. The song debuted at number three on the Billboard South Korea Songs in the chart issue dated May 7, 2022, ascending to number one in the chart issue dated June 4, 2022.

In Singapore, the song debuted at number four on the RIAS Top Streaming Chart in the chart issue dated March 18–24, 2022. The song also debuted at number 13 on the RIAS Top Regional Chart in the chart issue dated March 11–17, 2022, ascending to number one in the following week. The song also debuted at number six on the Billboard Singapore Songs in the chart issue dated April 2, 2022. On the Billboard Vietnam Hot 100, "Tomboy" debuted at number 32 in the chart issue dated March 24, 2022, ascending to number 12 in the following week. In Hong Kong, the song debuted at number 22 on the Billboard Hong Kong Songs in the chart issue dated March 26, 2022, ascending to number 11 the following week. In Taiwan, "Tomboy" debuted at number 15 on the Billboard Taiwan Songs in the chart issue dated March 26, 2022, ascending to number five in the following week. In Malaysia, the song debuted at number 13 on the RIM International Singles Streaming Chart in the chart issue dated March 18–24, 2022. The song also debuted at number 11 on the Billboard Malaysia Songs in the chart issue dated April 2, 2022, ascending to number nine in the following week.

In United States, the song debuted at number 14 on the Billboard World Digital Song Sales in the chart issue dated March 26, 2022, ascending to number 12 in the following week. Globally, the song debuted at number 58 on the Billboard Global 200 in the chart issue dated April 2, 2022.

== Music video ==
The music video, directed by Samson of High Quality Fish, was released by Cube Entertainment on March 14. It was described as "vibrant and powerful" and featuring "[the quintet in] Y2K-inspired alternative fashion [causing] havoc across the [scenes] with badass explosions, casual vandalism and boss choreography [in the first half]" before transitioning to "portray [the quintet] as dolls who work together as a team to drug, kidnap and rid themselves of a male doll who serves as [their] 'love interest'". Upon release, it accumulated 10 million views within 16 hours, which ranked at number one on YouTube's popularity page. Later it surpassed 40 million views in five days. On March 28, 2022, it was reported that the video surpassed 70 million views. On January 17, 2023, the music video surpassed 200 million views.

== Promotion ==
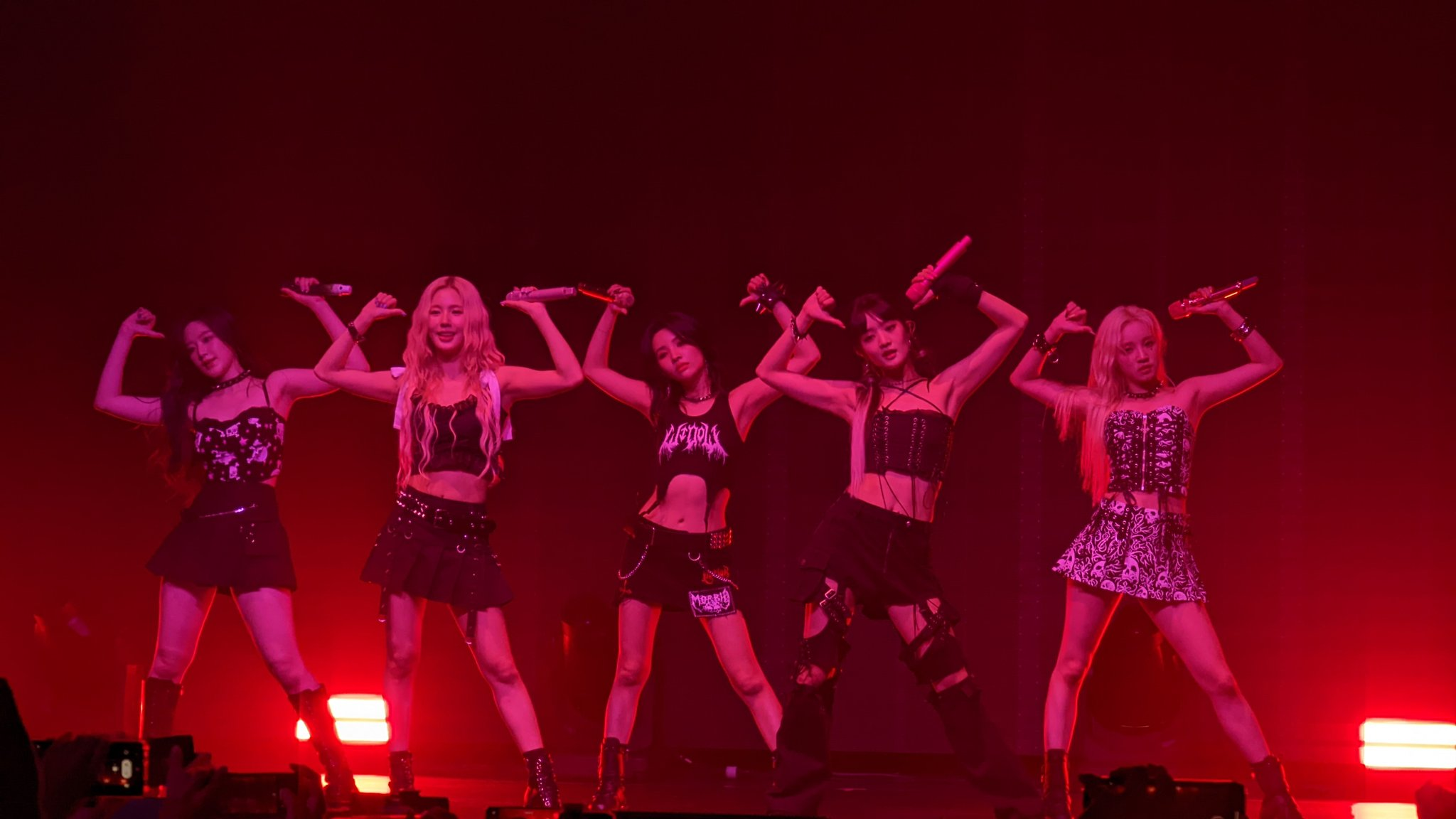
(G)I-dle performing "Tomboy" at Warfield Theatre in San Francisco, California on July 24, 2022.

Prior to the album's release, on March 14, 2022, (G)I-dle held a live event online to introduce the album and its songs, including "Tomboy", and to communicate with their fans. They subsequently performed on four music programs in the first week: Mnet's M Countdown on March 17, KBS's Music Bank on March 18, MBC's Show! Music Core on March 19, and SBS' Inkigayo on March 20. In the second week, the group performed on six programs: SBS MTV's The Show on March 22, MBC M's Show Champion on March 23, Mnet's M Countdown on March 24, KBS's Music Bank on March 25, MBC's Show! Music Core on March 26, and SBS' Inkigayo on March 27, where they won first place for all appearances except Music Bank. In the third week, the group performed on Mnet's M Countdown on March 31 and SBS's Inkigayo on April 3, where they won first place for both appearances.

== Accolades ==
Awards and nominations for "Tomboy"
Award ceremony	Year	Category	Result	Ref.
Asian Pop Music Awards	2022	Top 20 Songs of the Year (Overseas)	Won	
Asian Pop Music Awards	2022	Song of the Year (Overseas)	Nominated	
Asian Pop Music Awards	2022	Best Dance Performance (Overseas)	Nominated	
Circle Chart Music Awards	2023	Artist of the Year – Global Digital Music (March)	Won	
Genie Music Awards	2022	Song of the Year	Nominated	
Genie Music Awards	2022	Best Record Award	Won	
Korean Music Awards	2023	Song of the Year	Nominated	
Korean Music Awards	2023	Best K-pop Song	Nominated	
Melon Music Awards	2022	Music Video of the Year	Won	
Melon Music Awards	2022	Song of the Year	Nominated	

Music program awards for "Tomboy"
Program	Date (8 total)	Ref.
Inkigayo	March 27, 2022	
Inkigayo	April 3, 2022	
Inkigayo	June 5, 2022	
M Countdown	March 24, 2022	
M Countdown	March 31, 2022	
Show! Music Core	March 26, 2022	
Show Champion	March 23, 2022	
The Show	March 22, 2022	

Melon Weekly Popularity Award for "Tomboy"
Award	Date (2022)	Ref.
Weekly Popularity Award	March 28	
Weekly Popularity Award	April 4	
Weekly Popularity Award	April 11	

== Credits and personnel ==
Credits adapted from Melon and album liner notes.

Studio

- Cube Studio – recording, mixing
- Ingrid Studio – recording, digital editing
- Klang Studio – mixing
- 821 Sound mastering – mastering

Song credits

- (G)I-dle – vocals
  - Soyeon – background vocals, producer, lyrics, composition, arrangement
- Pop Time – composition, arrangement
- Jenci — background vocal, keyboard
- Jeon Jae-hee – background vocal
- Kim Ho-hyun – guitar
- Park Ji-young – keyboard
- Choi In-seong – bass
- Yang Young-eun – recording
- Choi Ye-ji – recording
- Jung Eun-kyung – digital editing
- Kang Seon-young – mix engineer
- Koo Jong-pil – mixing
- Kwon Nam-woo – mastering
- Yoo Eun-jin – assistant mastering

Visual credits

- Son Seung-hee (High Quality Fish) – Music video director
- Kim Se-hwan (Star System) – Performance director
- Hyunzzinii (Star System) – Choreographer
- Kiel Tutin – Choreographer

== Charts ==
=== Weekly charts ===
Weekly chart performance
Chart (2022)	Peak position
Global 200 (Billboard)	58
Hong Kong (Billboard)	11
Malaysia (Billboard)	9
Malaysia International (RIM)	13
Singapore (Billboard)	6
Singapore (RIAS)	4
South Korea (Gaon)	1
South Korea (K-pop Hot 100)	1
Taiwan (Billboard)	5
US World Digital Song Sales (Billboard)	12
Vietnam (Vietnam Hot 100)	12

=== Monthly charts ===
Monthly chart performance
Chart (2022)	Position
South Korea (Gaon)	2

=== Year-end charts ===
2022 year-end chart performance for "Tomboy"
Chart (2022)	Position
South Korea (Circle)	2

2023 year-end chart performance for "Tomboy"
Chart (2023)	Position
South Korea (Circle)	43

== Certifications ==
Streaming certifications for "Tomboy"
Region	Certification	Certified units/sales
Japan (RIAJ)	Gold	50,000,000^{†}
South Korea (KMCA)	Platinum	100,000,000^{†}
^{†} Streaming-only figures based on certification alone.

== Release history ==
Release history
Region	Date	Format	Version	Label
South Korea	March 14, 2022	Digital download; streaming	Original	Cube; Kakao
Various	March 14, 2022	Digital download; streaming	Original	Cube
Various	May 20, 2022	Digital download; streaming	R3hab remix	Cyb3rpvnk; The Unit; Cube

== See also ==
- List of Gaon Digital Chart number ones of 2022
- List of Inkigayo Chart winners (2022)
- List of K-pop Hot 100 number ones of 2022
- List of K-pop songs on the World Digital Song Sales chart
- List of M Countdown Chart winners (2022)
- List of Show! Music Core Chart winners (2022)
- List of Show Champion Chart winners (2022)
- List of The Show Chart winners (2022)
