= I'm the Trend =

2020 single by (G)I-dle

Single by (G)I-dle

from the album Dumdi Dumdi
- Language: Korean; Thai; English; Spanish
- A-side: "Dumdi Dumdi"
- Released: July 7, 2020
- Studio: Cube Studio
- Genre: Dance-pop
- Length: 3:25
- Label: Cube; Universal Music; Republic
- Songwriters: Minnie; Yuqi; Soyeon; FCM Houdini
- Producers: Minnie; Yuqi; Yuto; FCM Houdini

(G)I-dle singles chronology
"Oh My God" (2020)	"I'm the Trend" (2020)	"Dumdi Dumdi" (2020)

Music video
- "I'm the Trend" on YouTube

"I'm the Trend" (stylized as "i'M THE TREND") is a song recorded by South Korean girl group (G)I-dle dedicated for their fans, Neverland. It was released as a digital single on July 7, 2020 by Cube Entertainment. The single is composed by members Minnie and Yuqi, Yuto of Pentagon and FCM Houdini. The song was unveiled during their first online concert I-Land: Who Am I on July 5, 2020. An accompanying special clip for the song was uploaded onto (G)I-dle's YouTube channel simultaneously with the single's release.

The song is included in their first single album Dumdi Dumdi, released on August 3, 2020.

== Background and release ==
The song was first teased by Cube with photos of (G)I-dle's song title as stickers with the phrase "Coming soon-!" starting June 28 and ended on July 2, leaving fans questioned whether it is a Japanese version of the songs. Later, on July 5, Cube revealed the artwork teaser image of the digital single with logo stickers such as 'Latata', 'Senorita', 'Uh-Oh', 'Lion' and 'Oh my god'.

"I'm the Trend" is Minnie's first self-written song in about a year after the release of "Blow Your Mind" in February 2018 and their Japanese single "For You" from the Japanese debut album Latata in July 2019. Additionally, this release marks Yuqi's first contribution in writing, producing and composing in the group's discography.

== Composition and lyrics ==
"I'm the Trend" is a Latin music-based dance song that boasts an exciting rhythm, features lyrics that reference their other hit songs as points such as "Oh My God", "Blow Your Mind", "Latata", "Lion", "Maze", "Uh-Oh" and "Senorita". It is composed in the key of B minor, with a tempo of 145 BPM running three minutes and twenty-five seconds.

== Promotion and critical reception ==
"I'm the Trend" was first performed as an encore at their first solo concert, I-Land: Who Am I.

A special clip and lyric video was released on July 7, 2020.

Rania Aniftos from Billboard described the song as "infectious spunky tune".

== Commercial performance ==
The song debuted at number 96 on South Korea's Gaon Digital Chart with Gaon index of 4,608,218 on the chart issue dated July 5–11, 2020.

== Track listing ==
Digital download
No.	Title	Lyrics	Music	Arrangement	Length
1.	"I'm the Trend"	Minnie; Yuqi; Soyeon; FCM Houdini	FCM Houdini; Minnie; Yuqi; Yuto	FCM Houdini; Yuto	3:25
Total length:					3:25

== Accolades ==
Awards
Year	Organization	Category	Result	Ref.
2020	JOOX Hong Kong Top Music Awards Season 3	Top 20 Kpop songs	Nominated	

== Personnel ==
Credits are adapted from Melon.

- (G)I-dle – vocals
  - Minnie - producing, songwriting, chorus
  - Yuqi - producing, songwriting
  - Soyeon - songwriting
- Yuto of Pentagon - producing, record engineering, drum programming
- FCM Houdini - producing, record engineering, guitar, drum programming, piano
- FCM 667 - bass
- Jeon Yeon (Cube Studio) – record engineering, Recording
- Mr. Cho (Cube Studio) – mixed
- Kwon Nam-woo (821 Sound mastering) – mastering

== Charts ==
=== Weekly charts ===
Chart (2020)	Peak position
South Korea (Gaon)	96
South Korea (K-pop Hot 100)	58

== Release history ==
Region	Date	Format	Distributor
Various	July 7, 2020	Digital download; streaming	Cube; Kakao M; U-Cube; Republic
