= I-dle discography =

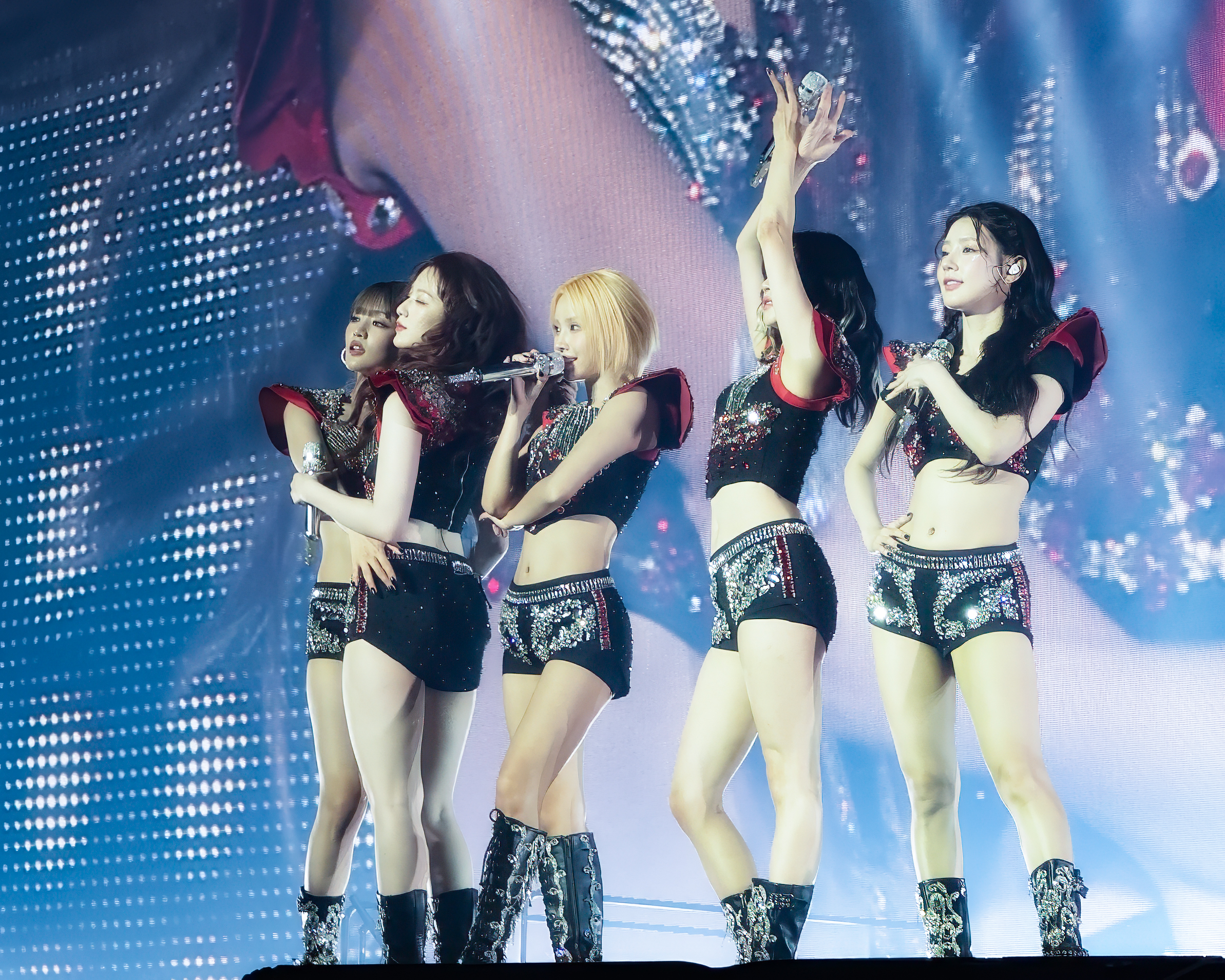
- I-dle in 2024
- Studio albums: 2
- EPs: 14
- Singles: 24
- Single albums: 1
- Other songs: 3
- Collaborations: 8
- Promotional singles: 4
- Soundtrack appearances: 3

South Korean girl group I-dle have released two studio albums, fourteen extended plays, one single album and twenty-four singles. They have also participated in eight collaboration songs and three soundtrack contributions.

Formed by Cube Entertainment in 2018, the group debuted as (G)I-dle on May 2, 2018, with the EP I Am led by the song "Latata" as their first single. The group continued with the release of their first digital single titled "Hann (Alone)" on August 14, 2018, peaking at number 8 on the Gaon Digital Chart. They released their second EP titled I Made on February 26, 2019, followed by the release of their second digital single titled "Uh-Oh" on June 26. A month later, (G)I-dle began their venture into the Japanese music market with the release of Latata on July 31. The same year, two more singles—"Put It Straight (Nightmare Version)" and "Lion"—was released through their participation in Mnet's survival show Queendom. "Lion" managed to gain commercial success and was nominated in Korean Music Awards.

In April 2020, (G)I-dle's third EP, I Trust, and its lead single "Oh My God", were released on April 6. The EP became the group's best-selling album and scored the second-highest first-day sales by a girl group with 91,311 physical copies sold. It debuted atop the Gaon Album Chart with over 110,000 copies and scored their highest debut on Billboard's World Albums chart. In August 2020, they released two albums; Dumdi Dumdi, a special summer single album on August 3 with the title track of the same name, and the group's second Japanese EP, Oh My God, on August 26. In January 2021, (G)I-dle's fourth EP, I Burn, and its lead single "Hwaa", were released on January 11. In March 2022, they released their first studio album I Never Die, on March 14. In October 2022, they released their EP I Love, on October 17. On May 15, 2023, they released their sixth EP I Feel. On October 5, 2023, they debuted their first English EP Heat. On January 29, 2024, they released their second studio album 2. On July 8, 2024, their seventh EP I Sway was released.

On May 2, 2025, with the group rebranding as I-dle, they released a special EP, We Are I-dle, to celebrate their seventh anniversary since debut. On May 19, 2025, the group released their eighth EP We Are. On October 3, 2025, they released their eponymous third Japanese EP, their first Japanese release in five years. I-dle released a digital single titled "Mono", featuring British rapper and record producer Skaiwater, on January 27, 2026. It was later included in the group's ninth EP We Made, released on July 6, 2026.

== Albums ==
=== Studio albums ===
List of studio albums, showing selected details, selected chart positions, sales figures and certifications
Title	Details	Peak chart positions						Sales	Certifications (Note: In April 2018, Gaon Music Chart introduced music recording certifications for albums, downloads, and streamings that were released and licensed in Korea starting from January 2018 onward.)
Title	Details	KOR	GER	JPN	UK Down.	US	US World	Sales	Certifications
I Never Die	Released: March 14, 2022; Label: Cube Entertainment, Kakao Entertainment; Formats: CD, digital download, streaming	2	83	68	72	—	13	KOR: 323,898	KMCA: Platinum
2	Released: January 29, 2024; Label: Cube Entertainment, Kakao Entertainment; Formats: CD, digital download, streaming	1	—	19	65	132	3	WW: 1,400,000; KOR: 1,687,293; JPN: 12,929	KMCA: Million; KMCA: 2× Platinum (POCA)
"—" denotes items that did not chart or were not released in that region.

== Extended plays ==
=== Korean extended plays ===
List of Korean extended plays, showing selected details, selected chart positions, sales figures and certifications
Title	Details	Peak chart positions								Sales	Certifications
Title	Details	KOR	FRA	JPN	JPN Hot	POL	SPA	US	US World	Sales	Certifications
I Am	Released: May 2, 2018; Label: Cube Entertainment; Formats: CD, digital download	6	—	—	—	—	—	—	5	KOR: 58,826	
I Made	Released: February 26, 2019; Label: Cube Entertainment; Formats: CD, digital download	2	—	—	—	—	—	—	5	KOR: 56,282	
I Trust	Released: April 6, 2020; Label: Cube Entertainment, Republic; Formats: CD, digital download	1	—	48	—	30	34	—	4	KOR: 175,891; JPN: 1,380; US: 2,000	
I Burn	Released: January 11, 2021; Label: Cube Entertainment, Republic; Formats: CD, digital download	3	—	35	—	—	—	—	10	KOR: 252,952; JPN: 1,366	KMCA: Platinum
I Love	Released: October 17, 2022; Label: Cube Entertainment; Formats: CD, digital download	1	—	20	85	—	—	71	4	KOR: 873,358; JPN: 5,463; US: 10,000	KMCA: 3× Platinum
I Feel	Released: May 15, 2023; Label: Cube Entertainment; Formats: CD, digital download	1	105	19	34	—	—	41	1	WW: 2,000,000; KOR: 1,519,632; JPN: 7,278; US: 16,000	KMCA: Million; KMCA: Platinum (POCA)
I Sway	Released: July 8, 2024; Label: Cube Entertainment; Formats: CD, digital download	2	—	19	40	—	—	— (Note: I Sway did not enter the Billboard 200, but peaked at number 13 on the Top Albums Sales.)	6	KOR: 1,005,979; JPN: 3,962	KMCA: 2× Platinum
We Are	Released: May 19, 2025; Label: Cube Entertainment; Formats: CD, digital download	2	—	11	50	—	—	— (Note: We Are did not enter the Billboard 200, but peaked at number 35 on the Top Albums Sales.)	10	KOR: 1,090,662; JPN: 10,158	KMCA: 3× Platinum
We Made	Released: July 6, 2026; Label: Cube Entertainment; Formats: CD, digital download	2	—	16	—	—	—	—	12	KOR: 556,307; JPN: 3,061	KMCA: 2× Platinum
"—" denotes items that did not chart or were not released in that region.

=== Japanese extended plays ===
List of Japanese extended plays, showing selected details, selected chart positions and sales figures
Title	Details	Peak chart positions		Sales
Title	Details	JPN	JPN Hot	Sales
Latata	Released: July 29, 2019; Label: Universal Music Japan; Formats: CD, digital download	5	15	JPN: 8,229
Oh My God	Released: August 26, 2020; Label: Universal Music Japan; Formats: CD, digital download	23	25	JPN: 3,807
I-dle	Released: October 3, 2025; Label: Warner Music Japan; Formats: CD, digital download; Track listing: 1. "Where Do We Go" (どうしよっかな); 2. "Invincible"; 3. "Farewell to the World" (愛せなかった世界へ永遠にじゃあね); 4. "Fate" (Japanese version; 傷つくのは嫌いだから); 5. "Queencard" (Japanese version)	3	10	JPN: 41,480

=== English extended plays ===
List of English extended plays, showing selected details, selected chart positions and sales figures
Title	Details	Peak chart positions				Sales
Title	Details	KOR	JPN	JPN Hot	US	Sales
Heat	Released: October 5, 2023; Label: Cube Entertainment, 88rising; Formats: CD, digital download	2	46	60	25	KOR: 169,782; JPN: 968

=== Compilation extended plays ===
List of compilation extended plays, showing selected details, selected chart positions and sales figures
Title	Details	Peak chart positions	Sales
Title	Details	KOR	Sales
We Are I-dle	Released: May 2, 2025; Label: Cube Entertainment; Formats: CD, digital download; Track listing: 1. "Latata" (I-dle version); 2. "Hann (Alone)" (I-dle version); 3. "Senorita" (I-dle version); 4. "Uh-Oh" (I-dle version); 5. "Oh My God" (I-dle version); 6. "Lion" (I-dle version); 7. "I'm the Trend" (I-dle version); 8. "Dumdi Dumdi" (I-dle version); 9. "Hwaa" (I-dle version)	4	KOR: 36,555

== Single albums ==
List of single albums, showing selected details, selected chart positions and sales figures
Title	Details	Peak chart positions	Sales
Title	Details	KOR	Sales
Dumdi Dumdi	Released: August 3, 2020; Label: Cube Entertainment, Republic; Formats: CD, digital download	2	KOR: 128,209

== Singles ==
=== Korean singles ===
List of Korean singles, showing year released, selected chart positions, sales figures, certifications and album name
Title	Year	Peak chart positions										Sales (Note: Sales figures for tracks are based on digital downloads, except noted.)	Certifications	Album
Title	Year	KOR Circle	KOR Billb. (Note: Includes the Billboard K-pop Hot 100 (2011–2014, 2017–2022), and Billboard South Korea Songs (2022 onwards). The Billboard K-pop Hot 100 chart launched on August 25, 2011, and was discontinued on July 16, 2014. The chart was re-established on June 4, 2017, but was discontinued on April 30, 2022, and replaced by South Korea Songs from Billboard's Hits of the World series.)	CHN Kor.	JPN Hot	NZ Hot	SGP	TWN	US World	VIE (Note: The Vietnam Hot 100 was first published in 2022 and was discontinued in December 2023.)	WW (Note: The Billboard Global 200 was first published in September 2020.)	Sales	Certifications	Album
"Latata"	2018	12	12	—	—	—	—	—	4	—	—	US: 3,000		I Am
"Hann (Alone)"	2018	8	10	—	—	39	24	—	2	—	—	US: 1,000		Non-album single
"Senorita"	2019	19	10	—	—	—	20	—	7	—	—	US: 1,000		I Made
"Uh-Oh"	2019	31	23	—	—	—	23	—	7	—	—		PMB: Gold	Non-album single
"Oh My God"	2020	15	10	—	—	—	21	—	3	—	—	US: 1,000	PMB: Platinum	I Trust
"Dumdi Dumdi"	2020	8	6	—	—	—	29	—	13	—	—			Dumdi Dumdi
"Hwaa"	2021	4	5	—	—	—	19	—	6	—	— (Note: "Hwaa" did not enter the Billboard Global 200, but peaked at number 173 on the Global Excl. US.)		PMB: Gold	I Burn
"Tomboy"	2022	1	1	—	—	—	4	5	12	12	58		KMCA: Platinum (Note: Certification for streaming); RIAJ: Gold (Note: Certification for streaming)	I Never Die
"Nxde"	2022	1	1	—	95	18	16	1	13	29	50		RIAJ: Gold (Note: Certification for streaming)	I Love
"Queencard"	2023	1	1	—	47	13	3	1	9	31	21		KMCA: Platinum; RIAJ: Platinum (Note: Certification for streaming)	I Feel
"Wife"	2024	11	6	23	—	—	— (Note: "Wife" did not enter RIAS Top Streaming Chart, but peaked at number 11 on Top Regional Chart.)	2	—	—	92			2
"Super Lady"	2024	10	9	10	49	—	23	2	—	—	114			2
"Klaxon"	2024	3	6	1	—	—	—	3	—	—	— (Note: "Klaxon" did not enter the Billboard Global 200, but peaked at number 95 on the Global Excl. US.)			I Sway
"Good Thing"	2025	76	—	1	—	—	—	5	—	—	—			We Are
"Crow"	2026	— (Note: "Crow" did not enter the Circle Digital Chart, but peaked at number 14 on the component Circle Download Chart.)	—	3	—	—	—	—	—	—	—			We Made
"Gimme Dat Love"	2026	91	—	1	—	—	—	—	—	—	—			We Made
"—" denotes items that did not chart or were not released in that region.

=== English singles ===
List of English singles, showing year released, selected chart positions and album name
Title	Year	Peak chart positions							Album
Title	Year	KOR Circle	KOR Billb.	CHN Kor.	HKG	NZ Hot	SGP Reg.	TWN	Album
"I Do"	2023	— (Note: "I Do" did not enter Circle Digital Chart, but peaked at number 51 on Circle Download Chart.)	—	—	—	39	—	13	Heat
"I Want That"	2023	195	—	—	17	28	23	3	Heat
"Mono" (featuring Skaiwater)	2026	95	86	1	8	—	30	3	We Made
"—" denotes items that did not chart or were not released in that region.

=== Japanese singles ===
List of Japanese singles, showing year released, selected chart positions and album name
Title	Year	Peak chart positions			Album
Title	Year	CHN Kor.	JPN Dig.	JPN Down.	Album
"Latata" (Japanese version)	2019	—	—	—	Latata
"Oh My God" (Japanese version)	2020	—	—	—	Oh My God
"Fate" (Japanese version; 傷つくのは嫌いだから)	2025	41	—	—	I-dle
"Where Do We Go" (どうしよっかな)	2025	9	—	—	I-dle
"Hide and Seek"	2026	74	43	45	Non-album single
"—" denotes items that did not chart or were not released in that region.

=== Promotional singles ===
List of promotional singles, showing year released, selected chart positions and album name
Title	Year	Peak chart positions				Album
Title	Year	KOR	KOR Hot	SGP	US World	Album
"Put It Straight" (싫다고 말해) (Nightmare version)	2019	199	100	—	—	Queendom Box of Pandora Pt. 1 and I Made
"Lion"	2019	19	5	20	5	Queendom Final Comeback Singles and I Trust
"I'm the Trend"	2020	96	58	—	—	Dumdi Dumdi
"Last Dance" (Promotional single for Universe)	2021	142	—	—	16	Non-album single
"—" denotes items that did not chart or were not released in that region.

== Other charted songs ==
List of other charted songs, showing year released, selected chart positions, certifications and album name
Title	Year	Peak chart positions						Certifications	Album
Title	Year	KOR	KOR Billb.	CHN Kor.	SGP Reg.	TWN	WW	Certifications	Album
"Hann (Alone in Winter)" (한(寒))	2021	106	100	—	—	—	—		I Burn
"Moon"	2021	102	72	—	—	—	—		I Burn
"Dahlia"	2021	114	—	—	—	—	—		I Burn
"Lost"	2021	123	—	—	—	—	—		I Burn
"Where Is Love"	2021	127	—	—	—	—	—		I Burn
"Never Stop Me" (말리지 마)	2022	119	79	—	—	—	—		I Never Die
"Villain Dies"	2022	154	—	—	—	—	—		I Never Die
"My Bag"	2022	22	9 (Note: "My Bag" peaked at number 34 on the now-defunct K-pop Hot 100, and peaked at number 9 on the new South Korea Songs chart.)	—	24	—			I Never Die
"Love"	2022	77	—	—	—	—	—		I Love
"Change"	2022	97	—	—	—	—	—		I Love
"Reset"	2022	129	—	—	—	—	—		I Love
"Sculpture" (조각품)	2022	144	—	—	—	—	—		I Love
"Dark (X-File)"	2022	147	—	—	—	—	—		I Love
"Allergy"	2023	18	16	—	—	7	—		I Feel
"Lucid"	2023	160	—	—	—	—	—		I Feel
"All Night"	2023	184	—	—	—	—	—		I Feel
"Paradise"	2023	173	—	—	—	—	—		I Feel
"Peter Pan" (어린 어른)	2023	195	—	—	—	—	—		I Feel
"Revenge"	2024	—	—	26	—	—	—		2
"Doll"	2024	—	—	13	—	—	—		2
"Vision"	2024	—	—	37	—	—	—		2
"7Days"	2024	—	—	31	—	—	—		2
"Fate" (나는 아픈 건 딱 질색이니까)	2024	1	1	1	23	5	95	KMCA: Platinum	2
"Rollie"	2024	—	—	33	—	—	—		2
"Last Forever"	2024	—	—	2	—	—	—		I Sway
"Bloom"	2024	—	—	6	—	—	—		I Sway
"Neverland"	2024	—	—	5	—	—	—		I Sway
"Girlfriend"	2025	—	—	5	—	—	—		We Are
"Love Tease"	2025	—	—	2	—	—	—		We Are
"Chain"	2025	—	—	10	—	—	—		We Are
"Unstoppable"	2025	—	—	11	—	—	—		We Are
"If You Want" (그래도 돼요)	2025	—	—	12	—	—	—		We Are
"Invincible"	2025	—	—	28	—	—	—		I-dle
"Farewell To The World" (愛せなかった世界へ永遠にじゃあね)	2025	—	—	46	—	—	—		I-dle
"Morning"	2026	—	—	5	—	—	—		We Made
"Love is Pain"	2026	—	—	4	—	—	—		We Made
"—" denotes a recording that did not chart or was not released in that territory.

== Collaborations ==
List of collaborations, showing year released, selected chart positions, certifications and album name
Title	Year	Peak chart positions										Certifications	Album
Title	Year	KOR	CAN Dig.	NZ Hot.	SCO	SGP	SWE Heat.	UK Down.	UK Indie	US Dig.	US World	Certifications	Album
"Follow Your Dreams" (한걸음)	2018	—	—	—	—	—	—	—	—	—	—		ONE (with United Cube (Note: Hyuna, Jo Kwon, BtoB, CLC, Pentagon and Yoo Seon-ho))
"Upgrade"	2018	— (Note: "Upgrade" did not enter Gaon Digital Chart, but debuted and peaked at number 99 on Gaon BGM Chart.)	—	—	—	—	—	—	—	—	—		ONE (with United Cube)
"Young & One"	2018	—	—	—	—	—	—	—	—	—	—		ONE (with United Cube)
"Pop/Stars" (with Madison Beer and Jaira Burns as K/DA)	2018	39	30	6	82	6	4	75	17	30	1	RIAA: Platinum; RMNZ: Gold	Non-album single
"The Baddest" (with Bea Miller and Wolftyla as K/DA)	2020	178	30	6	70	7	—	74	18	28	1		All Out
"More" (with Madison Beer, Jaira Burns and Lexie Liu as K/DA)	2020	— (Note: "More" did not enter Gaon Digital Chart, but debuted and peaked at number 96 on Gaon Download Chart.)	48	9	—	10	—	—	23	—	1	RIAA: Gold	All Out
"Expectations" (with Anne-Marie and Minnie)	2023	55	—	—	—	—	—	—	—	—	—		Non-album single
"This Time Around" (with Jennifer Lopez)	2024	—	—	—	—	—	—	—	—	—	—		This Is Me... Now
"—" denotes items that did not chart or were not released in that region.

== Soundtrack appearances ==
List of soundtrack appearances, showing year released and album name
Title	Year	Album	Ref.
"Run! (Relay)"	2018	Running Man: Pululu's Counterattack OST	
"Help Me"	2019	Her Private Life OST Part 1	
"Arise" (Note: "Arise" debuted at 95 on the TME Korean Chart.)	2025	Solo Leveling: Arise (Original Soundtrack)	
"Invincible"	2025	Beyblade X (Season 3 Opening)	

== Other songs ==
List of other songs, showing year released and album name
Title	Year	Album	Notes	Ref.
"Sad Dream" (비몽)	2019	Immortal Songs: Singing the Legend – Let's Dance Time Koyote	original song by Koyote	
"Show"	2020	Two Yoo Project Sugar Man 3 Episode 8	original song by Kim Won-jun	
"Abracadabra" (Note: "Abracadabra" debuted at 48 on the TME Korean Chart.)	2024	Abracadabra (The Seasons: Red Carpet with Lee Hyo Ri)	original song by Brown Eyed Girls	

== See also ==
- List of songs recorded by I-dle
