= Syncopation World Tour =

2026 concert tour by I-dle

- World tour by I-dle
- Location: Asia; Oceania
- Start date: February 21, 2026
- End date: August 29, 2026
- No. of shows: 12

I-dle concert chronology
- I-dle First Japan Tour (2025); Syncopation World Tour (2026)

The Syncopation World Tour was the fourth concert tour by South Korean girl group I-dle. The tour began on February 21, 2026 in Seoul, and concluded on August 29, 2026, in Macau.

== Background ==
In December 2025, Cube Entertainment announced that I-dle would be embarking on their 4th world tour titled "Syncopation", following their I-dol World Tour that took place in 2024. It began with 2 shows in Seoul's KSPO Dome on February 21 and February 22, before continuing across Asia, Oceania, and North America. Talking about the name of the tour, Miyeon said, "I feel like 'Syncopation' is a word that really suits who we are right now. It feels irregular, yet full of life and impossible to predict. To me, it reflects i-dle continuing to grow by embracing a wide range of new challenges with an open and positive mindset." The leg in North America was cancelled on April 19, 2026.

== Ticket sales ==
All tickets for the Taipei Dome concert were sold out upon the general sales release. It will mark the first time a K-pop girl group will perform there.

== Set list ==
=== February 2026 to August 2026 ===
This set list was taken from the show in Seoul on February 21, 2026. It does not represent all shows throughout the tour.

Act 1

1. "Mono"
2. "Nxde"
3. "HER" (MINNIE solo)
4. "Oh my god"
5. "LION"
6. "Love Tease"
7. "Reno" (Miyeon solo)

Act 2

8. "HWAA"
9. "Red Redemption" (Shuhua solo)
10. "Put It Straight" (Nightmare version)
11. "Revenge"
12. "Good Thing"
13. "ICEBLUERABBIT" (Soyeon solo)
14. "Wife"
15. "Fate"

Act 3

16. "Crow"
17. "I Want That"
18. "Pop/Stars" (K/DA cover)
19. "M.O." (Yuqi solo)
20. "MY BAG"
21. "Queencard"
22. "TOMBOY"
23. "Super Lady"

Encore

24. "LATATA"
25. "Klaxon"
26. "Neverland"

==== Alterations ====
- "Girlfriend" was performed after “Wife” for the Taipei show.
- “Allergy”, “Never Stop Me”, and “Girlfriend” replaced “Wife” for both shows in Hong Kong.
- "Sleeplessly", a sodagreen cover, was performed after “Klaxon” for the Taipei show.
- "Genie Ja", a Ratree cover, was performed after “Klaxon” for the Bangkok show.
- "Can’t Get You Out of My Head", a Kylie Minogue cover, was performed after “Klaxon” for both the Melbourne and Sydney shows.
- "Whenever", a JJ Lin cover, replaced“Klaxon” for the Singapore show.
- "どうしよっかな (Where Do We Go)" replaced “Klaxon” for both shows in Yokohama.
- "红日 (Red Sun)", a Hacken Lee cover, was performed after “Klaxon” for the Hong Kong shows.

== Tour dates ==
List of tour dates
Date (2026)	City	Country	Venue	Attendance
February 21	Seoul	South Korea	KSPO Dome	—
February 22	Seoul	South Korea	KSPO Dome	—
March 7	Taipei	Taiwan	Taipei Dome	36,000
March 21	Bangkok	Thailand	Impact Arena	—
May 27	Melbourne	Australia	Rod Laver Arena	—
May 30	Sydney	Australia	Qudos Bank Arena	—
June 13	Singapore		Singapore Indoor Stadium	—
June 20	Yokohama	Japan	K-Arena Yokohama	—
June 21	Yokohama	Japan	K-Arena Yokohama	—
June 27	Hong Kong		Kai Tak Stadium	—
June 28	Hong Kong		Kai Tak Stadium	—
August 29	Macau		Galaxy Macau	—
Total				—

== Cancelled dates ==
List of cancelled dates
Date (2026)	City	Country	Venue	Reason
August 2	Hamilton	Canada	TD Coliseum	Scheduling conflict
August 4	Newark	United States	Prudential Center	Scheduling conflict
August 6	Philadelphia	United States	Xfinity Mobile Arena	Scheduling conflict
August 8	Atlanta	United States	State Farm Arena	Scheduling conflict
August 11	Orlando	United States	Kia Center	Scheduling conflict
August 13	San Antonio	United States	Frost Bank Center	Scheduling conflict
August 16	Mexico City	Mexico	Palacio de los Deportes	Scheduling conflict
August 19	Inglewood	United States	Kia Forum	Scheduling conflict
August 21	Oakland	United States	Oakland Arena	Scheduling conflict
August 23	Seattle	United States	Climate Pledge Arena	Scheduling conflict
