= I-dle First Japan Tour =

2025 concert tour by I-dle

- National tour by I-dle
- Location: Asia
- Associated albums: I-dle
- Start date: October 4, 2025
- End date: October 19, 2025
- No. of shows: 4

I-dle concert chronology
- I-dol World Tour (2024); I-dle First Japan Tour (2025); Syncopation World Tour (2026)

The I-dle First Japan Tour is the fourth concert tour by the South Korean girl group I-dle and the first Japanese tour by the group. The tour began on October 4, 2025, in Saitama and ended on October 19, in Hyogo.

== Background ==
On March 30, 2025, Cube announced I-dle's fourth tour, and first Japanese tour. The group was set to tour Saitama and Hyogo prefectures, across a total of four shows split between the two prefectures. The announcement of the tour came following the release of the group's third Japanese EP: I-dle, featuring their first Japanese-language original tracks.

== Ticket sales ==
Tickets for the tour were released on September 12 and sold out by October, living up to the tour's highly predicted success. The I-dle EP peaked at number 1 on the Oricon daily charts and 3rd on the weekly charts due to the success of the tour.

== Setlist ==
The following setlist is from the show in October 4 in Saitama, Japan.

1. "Where Do We Go"
2. "Fate (Japanese version)"
3. "Klaxon"
4. "Wife"
5. "Uh-Oh (Japanese version)"
6. "Dumdi Dumdi (Japanese version)"
7. "Girlfriend"
8. "Forever Eve" (Miyeon solo - Tenblank cover)
9. "Butter Fly" (Soyeon solo - Kōji Wada cover)
10. "Ai♡Scream!" (Minnie, Shuhua, Yuqi unit - Ai♡Scream! cover)
11. "Farewell To The World"
12. "Latata (Japanese version)"
13. "Hann (Japanese version)"
14. "Senorita (Japanese version)"
15. "Invincible"
16. "Allergy"
17. "Never Stop Me"
18. "Tomboy"
19. "Queencard (Japanese version)"
20. "Good Thing"

Encore

21. "Where Do We Go"
22. "Tung Tung"
23. "Neverland"

== Tour dates ==
List of tour dates
Date (2025)	Prefecture	Country	Venue	Attendance
October 4	Saitama	Japan	Saitama Super Arena	(100%)
October 5	Saitama	Japan	Saitama Super Arena	(100%)
October 18	Hyogo	Japan	GLION Arena Kobe	(100%)
October 19	Hyogo	Japan	GLION Arena Kobe	(100%)
Total				(100%)
