= I-dol World Tour =

2024 concert tour by (G)I-dle

i-DOL World Tour
- Tour by (G)I-dle
- Promotional poster for Seoul concerts
- Associated albums: 2 I Sway
- Start date: August 3, 2024
- End date: November 2, 2024
- No. of shows: 14 in Asia; 6 in North America; 2 in Oceania; 22 in total

(G)I-dle concert chronology
- I Am Free-ty World Tour (2023); I-dol World Tour (2024); I-dle First Japan Tour (2025)

The I-dol World Tour (stylized as i-DOL) was the third worldwide concert tour by South Korean girl group (G)I-dle, in support of their second studio album 2 (2024) and seventh extended play I Sway (2024). The tour began on August 3, 2024 in Seoul, South Korea, and concluded on November 2, 2024 in Sydney, Australia. The tour consisted of 22 shows in 14 countries across Asia, North America, and Oceania.

== Background ==
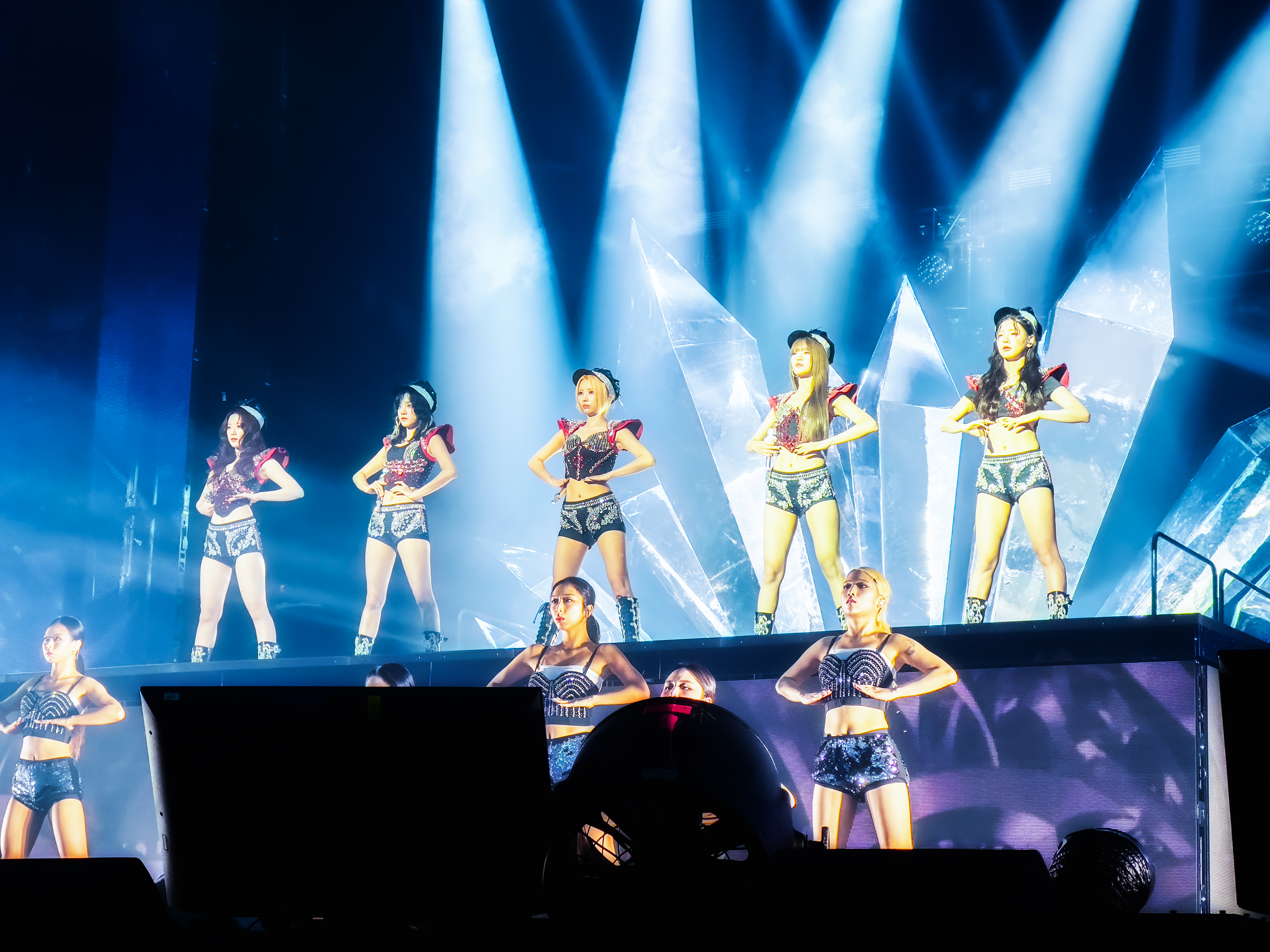
(G)I-dle performing in Tacoma

In May 2024, (G)I-dle's Cube Entertainment announced that (G)I-dle would be embarking on their third world tour titled "I-dol", following their I Am Free-ty World Tour the previous year. It began with two shows in Seoul's KSPO Dome on August 3 and August 4, before continuing across Asia, North America, and Oceania.

== Reception ==
Pyo Kyung-min of The Korea Times lauded the group's performance, calling the concert "testament to the group's polished stage presence" and "unparalleled command of the stage", giving special mention to Soyeon's performance of "Is This Bad B****** Number?", and the group's performances of "Wife", "Fate" and their newest single "Klaxon".

Other reviews by Korean outlets were also favorable, with MK Sports' crediting the group's "intense performance", MHN Sports noting that both the solo and group performances shined, and Esports News' Kim Ye-na called the concert "high quality" with "personal charm".

Soyeon's solo performance garnered media attention, due to her alluding to the end of her contract with Cube Entertainment towards the end of the year. Cube released a press statement claiming the lyrics were simply a spontaneous part of the performance, the contract renewals is for the next year, and that "Soyeon's spontaneous action, without discussing it with us first, could cause harm to the company". Soyeon responded to this via her Instagram account, where she revealed that she did not lie about the date of her contract ending, and did not hide the lyrics from the company and performed it in front of them multiple times during rehearsals. Following that Cube released an official statement apologizing for causing concerns, and announced that their previously reported statement was "the opinion of one individual" and not an official statement by the agency. Cube confirmed the contract's end date is true, that they were aware of Soyeon's lyrics ahead of time and are currently in the process of "smoothly discussing" a contract renewal.

== Setlist ==
The following set list is from the shows in Seoul, South Korea. It is not intended to represent all shows from the tour.

1. "Super Lady"
2. "Revenge"
3. "Latata"
4. "Oh My God"
5. "Villain Dies"
6. "Doll"
7. "Water" (Tyla cover; Shuhua dance solo)
8. "Radio" (Yuqi solo) (Note: Unreleased song at the time)
9. "Like a Dream" (Minnie solo)
10. "Is This Bad B****** Number?" (Soyeon solo)
11. "Sky Walking" (Miyeon solo)
12. "Wife"
13. "Uh-Oh"
14. "Klaxon"
15. "Fate"
16. "Allergy"
17. "Never Stop Me"
18. "Lion"
19. "Pop/Stars"
20. "My Bag"
21. "Queencard"
22. "Tomboy"

Encore

August 3 (Day 1)

1. "I'm the Trend"
2. "Bloom"
3. "Neverland"

August 4 (Day 2)

1. "I'm the Trend"
2. "Last Forever"
3. "7Days"
4. "Neverland"
Notes
- During the encore stage at the Hong Kong shows, they performed a cover of Joey Yung "My Pride" in Cantonese.
- During the shows in Tokyo, Soyeon performed her unreleased song "Not Enough" in Japanese, for her solo stage in place of "Is This Bad B****** Number?".
- During the encore stage at the Tokyo shows, they performed a cover of Aimyon "Marigold" in Japanese.
- During the shows in North America, Minnie performed a solo version of "Change", for her solo stage in place of "Like a Dream".
- For the encore stage of the North America shows, they performed their English singles "I Want That" and "I DO".
- During the shows in Taipei, Yuqi and Shuhua performed a cover of S.H.E "Super Star" in Mandarin as a duet, for their solo stage in place of "Water" and "Radio".
- During the encore stage at the Taipei shows, they performed a cover of WeiBird "Red Scarf" in Mandarin.
- During the encore stage at the Bangkok shows, they performed a cover of Ink Waruntorn "Pob Rak" in Thai.
- During the encore stage at the Macau shows, they performed a cover of Sandy Lam "At Least I've Got You" in Mandarin.
- During the shows in Melbourne and Sydney, Minnie performed a solo version of "Change", for her solo stage in place of "Like a Dream".
- For the encore stage at the Melbourne and Sydney shows, they performed their English singles "I Want That" and "I DO".

== Tour dates ==
Date (2024)	City	Country	Venue	Attendance
August 3	Seoul	South Korea	KSPO Dome	16,000
August 4	Seoul	South Korea	KSPO Dome	16,000
August 23	Hong Kong	China	AsiaWorld–Arena	—
August 24	Hong Kong	China	AsiaWorld–Arena	—
August 25	Hong Kong	China	AsiaWorld–Arena	—
August 31	Tokyo	Japan	Ariake Arena	20,000
September 1	Tokyo	Japan	Ariake Arena	20,000
September 6	Tacoma	United States	Tacoma Dome	27,000
September 8	Oakland	United States	Oakland Arena	27,000
September 10	Anaheim	United States	Honda Center	27,000
September 13	Houston	United States	Toyota Center	—
September 15	Rosemont	United States	Allstate Arena	—
September 18	Belmont Park	United States	UBS Arena	—
October 4	Taipei	Taiwan	Taipei Arena	30,000
October 5	Taipei	Taiwan	Taipei Arena	30,000
October 6	Taipei	Taiwan	Taipei Arena	30,000
October 19	Bangkok	Thailand	Impact Arena	—
October 25	Macau	China	Galaxy Arena	30,000
October 26	Macau	China	Galaxy Arena	30,000
October 27	Macau	China	Galaxy Arena	30,000
October 31	Melbourne	Australia	Rod Laver Arena	—
November 2	Sydney	Australia	Qudos Bank Arena	—
Total				—
