= Shuhua =

Taiwanese singer and actress (born 2000)

- Shuhua in 2026
- Born: Yeh Shu-hua; January 6, 2000 (age 26); Taoyuan, Taiwan
- Education: Hwa Kang Arts School
- Occupations: Singer; actress
- Musical career
- Origin: Seoul, South Korea
- Genres: Dance-pop; K-pop; C-pop
- Instrument: Vocals
- Years active: 2018–present
- Labels: Cube; Hot Idol
- Member of: I-dle

Chinese name
- Traditional Chinese: 葉舒華
- Simplified Chinese: 叶舒华
- Hanyu Pinyin: Yè Shūhuá
- Wade–Giles: Yeh Shu-hua

Yeh Shu-hua (Chinese: 葉舒華; born January 6, 2000), known mononymously as Shuhua (Korean: 슈화), is a Taiwanese singer and actress based in South Korea. She is a member of the South Korean girl group I-dle, which debuted as (G)I-dle under Cube Entertainment in May 2018. She made her acting debut in Happily Ever After (2026), which premiered at the Toronto International Film Festival.

== Early life ==
Shuhua was born on January 6, 2000, in Yangmei, Taoyuan, Taiwan as the second of three daughters. Of mixed ancestry, her father is Han of the Hakka subgroup, while her mother is Atayal, one of the Taiwanese indigenous peoples. Shuhua's native language is Mandarin, and she acknowledges not being fully fluent in Hakka. Additionally, she is proficient in Korean and has a good command of both the English and Japanese languages. She attended Hwa Kang Arts School in Taipei with a focus on theatre. She gained an interest in K-pop after being inspired by Hyuna.

== Career ==
=== 2016–2018: Pre-debut activities ===
In her youth, she planned on becoming a celebrity. In May 2016, Shuhua was recruited by Cube Entertainment during the Cube Star World Audition. She finished her first year of high school before moving to South Korea to be a trainee. In June 2017, Shuhua participated in a promotional video for Rising Star Cosmetics along with Yuqi and Minnie, future bandmates of (G)I-dle. In September 2017, she and Yoo Seon-ho acted in 10cm's "Pet" music video.

=== 2018–present: (G)I-dle and solo activities ===
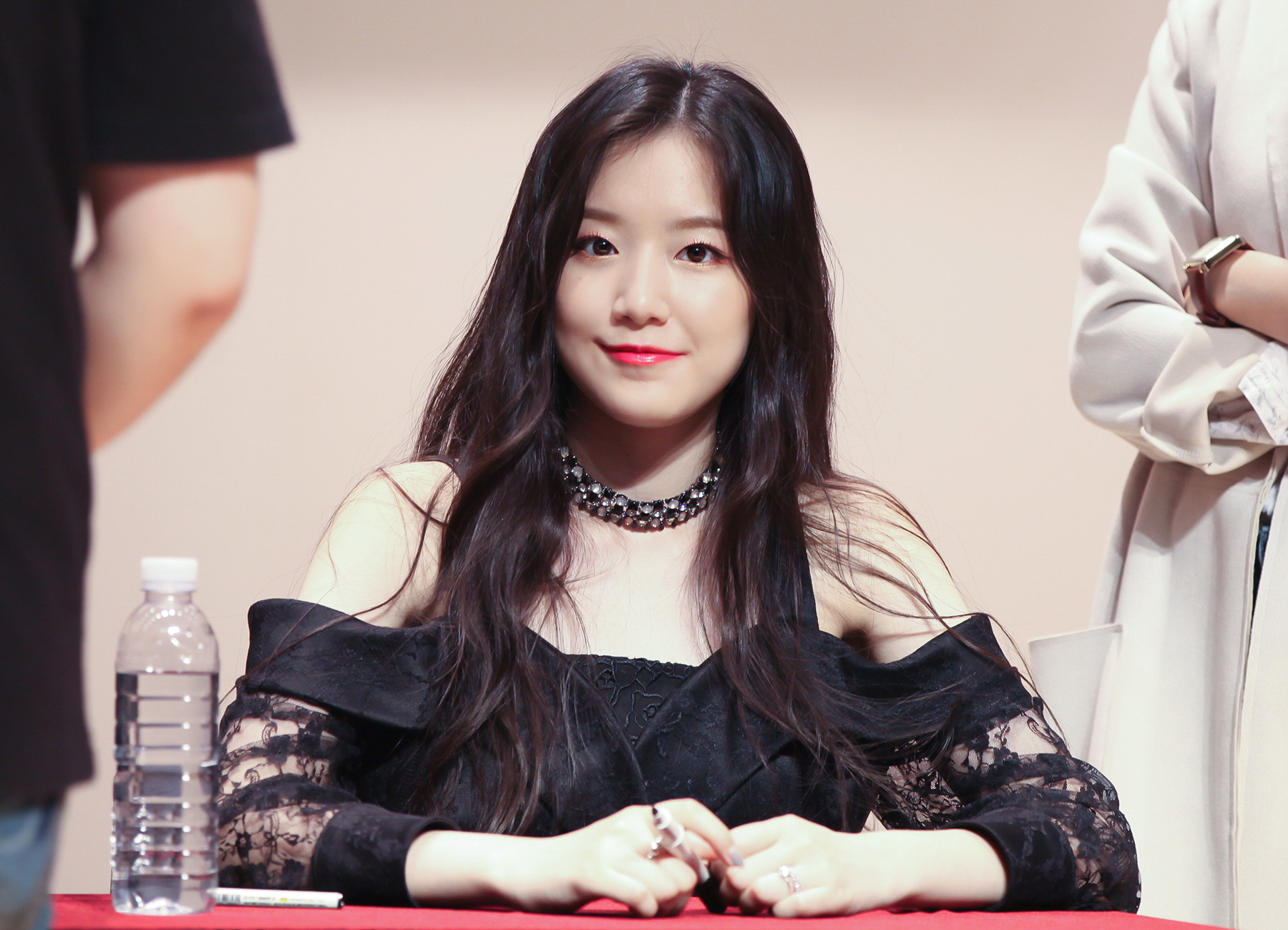
Shuhua in 2018

After being a trainee for two years, She debuted with (G)I-dle on May 2, 2018, with I Am.

She won the bronze medal for rhythmic gymnastics at the 16th Idol Star Athletics Championships in 2019. In December 2020, she joined the 2020 KBS Song Festival Maknae Special Stage, delivering a performance of Apink's "I Don't Know" alongside Itzy's Yuna, Iz*One's Jang Won-young, and Oh My Girl's Arin. Later in December 2020, Shuhua participated in an episode of the South Korean program Paik Farther Don't Stop The Food! along with bandmate Yuqi in which each of the contestants have a cooking competition.

She was selected as the host for the web entertainment show Workdol in 2023. She went on temporary hiatus on February 8, 2024, due to health issues, but she returned on March 21, 2024, for the MLB Seoul Series performance.

She was selected for the May edition of GQ Taiwan's GQ Global Creativity Awards.

In September 2026, she made her acting debut as "ideal daughter" Kitty in Happily Ever After, which premiered at that year's iteration of the Toronto International Film Festival. Directed by Feng-i Fiona Roan, the film focuses on a family's dynamics after they adopt a stray cat.

== Other ventures ==
In April 2024, Shuhua became a brand ambassador for Robinmay, a women's bag brand, and D+AF, a shoe brand.

In October 2025, she was appointed as tourism ambassador for her hometown Taoyuan, Taiwan.

== Discography ==
=== Soundtrack appearances ===
Title	Year	Album
"Burn Me into the Light" (with Minnie)	2025	The Resurrected OST

=== Songwriting credits ===
All song credits are adapted from the Korea Music Copyright Association's database unless stated otherwise.

Year	Album	Artist	Song	Lyrics		Music	
Year	Album	Artist	Song	Credited	With	Credited	With
2025	We Are	I-dle	"If You Want" (그래도 돼요)	Yes	—	No	—N/a

== Filmography ==
=== Film ===
Year	Title	Role	Notes	Ref.
2026	Happily Ever After	Lin Chia Chi/Kitty	Scheduled to be screened at the 2026 Toronto International Film Festival	

=== Television show ===
Year	Title	Role	Ref.
2024	What a Trip	Herself	
2024	Ai's Kitchen	Herself / Guest intern	
2025	Mnet 30th Chart Show	MC	

=== Web shows ===
Year	Title	Role	Notes	Ref.
2023	Workdol	MC	May 25 to December 21	

=== Music video appearances ===
Year	Artist	Song	Notes	Ref.
2017	10cm	"Pet"	along with Yoo Seon-ho	
2025	Eric Chou	"Almost"	—N/a	

== Awards and nominations ==
Name of the award ceremony, year presented, category, nominee of the award, and the result of the nomination
Award ceremony	Year	Category	Nominee / Work	Result	Ref.
Asia Artist Awards	2025	Best Choice – Singer	Shuhua	Won	
