= I-dle =

South Korean girl group

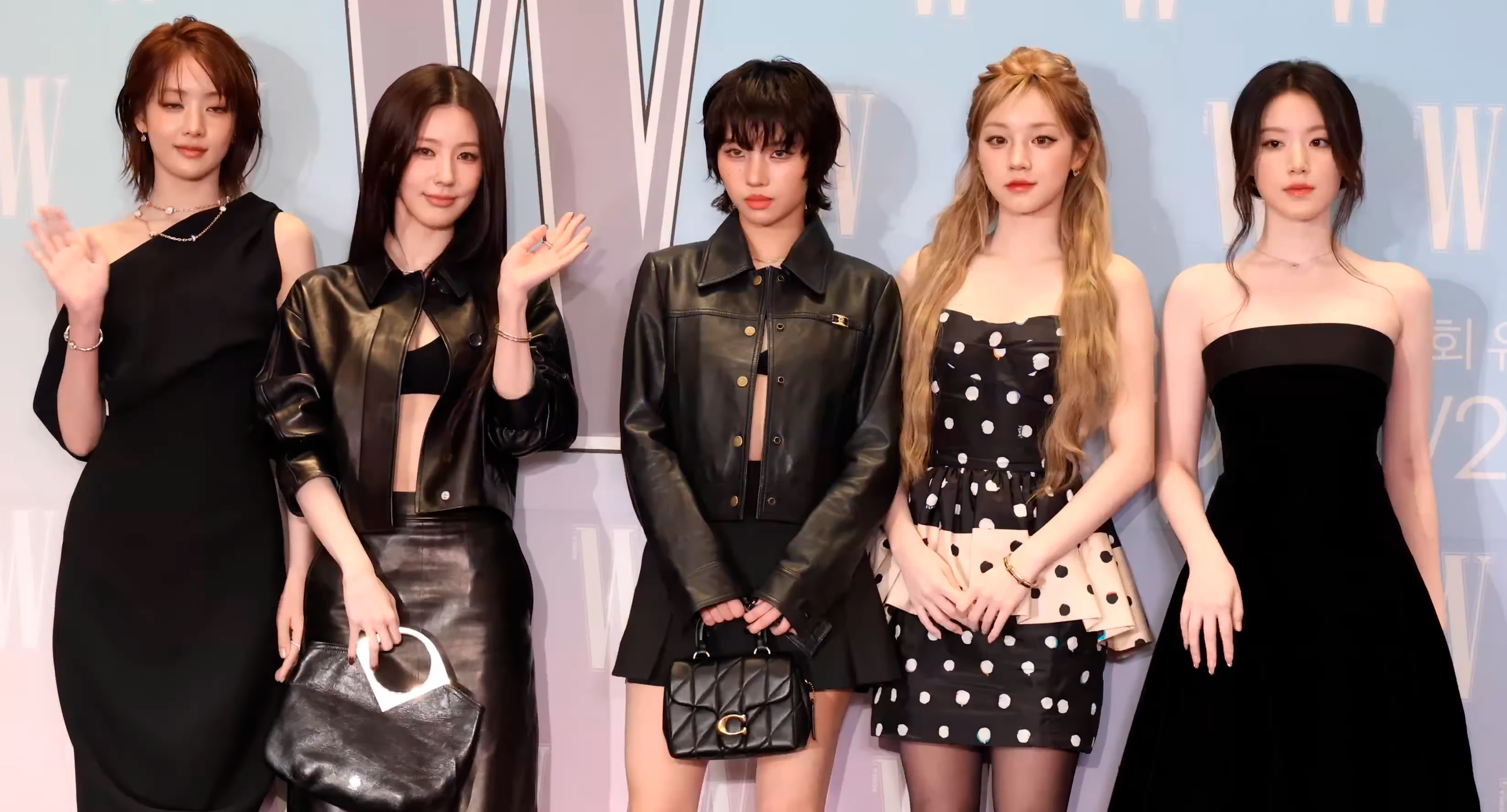
- I-dle in October 2025; (L–R: Minnie, Miyeon, Soyeon, Yuqi, and Shuhua)

Background information
- Also known as: (G)I-dle
- Origin: Seoul, South Korea
- Genres: K-pop; pop; trap; hip hop; EDM
- Years active: 2018–present
- Labels: Cube; U-Cube; Republic; 88rising; Warner Music Japan
- Members: Miyeon; Minnie; Soyeon; Yuqi; Shuhua
- Past members: Soojin
- Website: cubeent.co.kr

Korean name
- Hangul: 아이들
- RR: Aideul
- MR: Aidŭl

I-dle (Korean: 아이들; stylized in all lowercase), formerly known as (G)I-dle ((여자)아이들; (Yeoja)aideul), is a South Korean girl group formed by Cube Entertainment in 2018. The group consists of five members: Miyeon, Minnie, Soyeon, Yuqi, and Shuhua. (G)I-dle was originally a sextet ensemble; member Soojin departed the group on August 14, 2021. They are praised for their musicality, versatility, and for breaking stereotypes as a "self-producing" idol group, known for writing and producing much of their material. Since their debut, they have been described as one of the most successful South Korean girl groups outside of the "big four" (Note: The "Big Four" refers to Hybe Corporation, YG Entertainment, JYP Entertainment, and SM Entertainment) record labels.

(G)I-dle debuted with the extended play (EP) I Am and its lead single "Latata" on May 2, 2018. After several moderately successful releases, the group rose to prominence with "Tomboy", the viral lead single of their first studio album I Never Die (2022). The song was a critical and commercial success, peaking at number one on the Circle Digital Chart. Their next single, "Nxde", also topped the chart and made (G)I-dle the only artist to have two songs achieve a perfect all-kill in 2022. It also made them the first act from an independent label to debut on the US Billboard Pop Airplay chart with a non-English song.

(G)I-dle's sixth EP, I Feel (2023), produced the single "Queencard", which marked the group's third consecutive number-one single in South Korea. The album became their first to sell over one million copies in South Korea, and sold two million copies worldwide in 2023, according to the IFPI. In 2024, the group released their second studio album 2 and their seventh EP I Sway, which each sold over one million copies in South Korea. The releases yielded the top-ten singles "Super Lady" and "Klaxon" and the number-one song "Fate", which found success despite not being released as a single domestically. After renewing their contract, the group rebranded to I-dle and released their million-selling eighth EP We Are in 2025.

== History ==
=== Name ===
In an interview with The Star, group leader Soyeon revealed that the name "Idle" (아이들) came to her when she was composing "Idle Song", her second digital single. She suggested it to Cube Entertainment, and the name was finalized after undergoing internal competition. However, the name received mixed reactions in South Korea and internationally since "아이들" (aideul) means "children", and "idle" in English refers to someone who avoids work. Accordingly, the group was renamed (G)I-dle, with the "I" standing for individuality, the hyphen showing that the name has been divided into two parts, and "Dle" (deul) as the plural form of "I" in Korean to indicate a group of six different personalities gathering together. When the name is stated aloud, the "G" enclosed in parentheses is not included. Following their return as a quintet, on an episode of 1theK Original's IDDP (released on March 15, 2022), the group confirmed they would like to be referred to verbally as "I-dle". The group's name was officially changed to I-dle in May 2025.

=== Pre-debut activities ===
The official logo of (G)I-dle till May 2025

Soyeon was a trainee who represented Cube Entertainment in the survival show Produce 101, peaking at 20th place on the final episode. However, she did not become a member of the winning girl group, I.O.I. Soyeon also competed in the third season of the rap competition reality show Unpretty Rapstar, finishing as the second runner-up. She later debuted as a soloist, releasing two digital singles, "Jelly" and "Idle Song".

Miyeon previously trained under YG Entertainment between 2010 and 2015, leaving the company after unknown complications regarding her debut with Blackpink and attending a vocal academy. Before joining Cube Entertainment, she was a freelance singer and appeared as an associate singer with Lim Seul-ong in Urban Zakapa's Canada Tour in September 2016. In 2017, Miyeon had a small part in Lim Seul-ong's "You" music video. Soojin was a former trainee under DN Entertainment in 2015. She trained as a member of the girl group Vividiva with the stage name N.NA but left before the group's debut. Minnie featured in Line Friends' album Dance Party, which was released in November 2017. In September 2017, Shuhua appeared alongside Yoo Seon-ho in 10cm's "Pet" music video.

On April 5, 2018, Cube Entertainment revealed the name of their upcoming girl group, (G)I-dle. Before their debut, Cube unveiled the lineup to the public through Dingo Music's dance busking at Hongdae, Seoul. The busking performance video exceeded two million views on YouTube less than three weeks after its initial upload on April 15, 2018.

=== 2018: Debut, I Am and "Hann (Alone)" ===
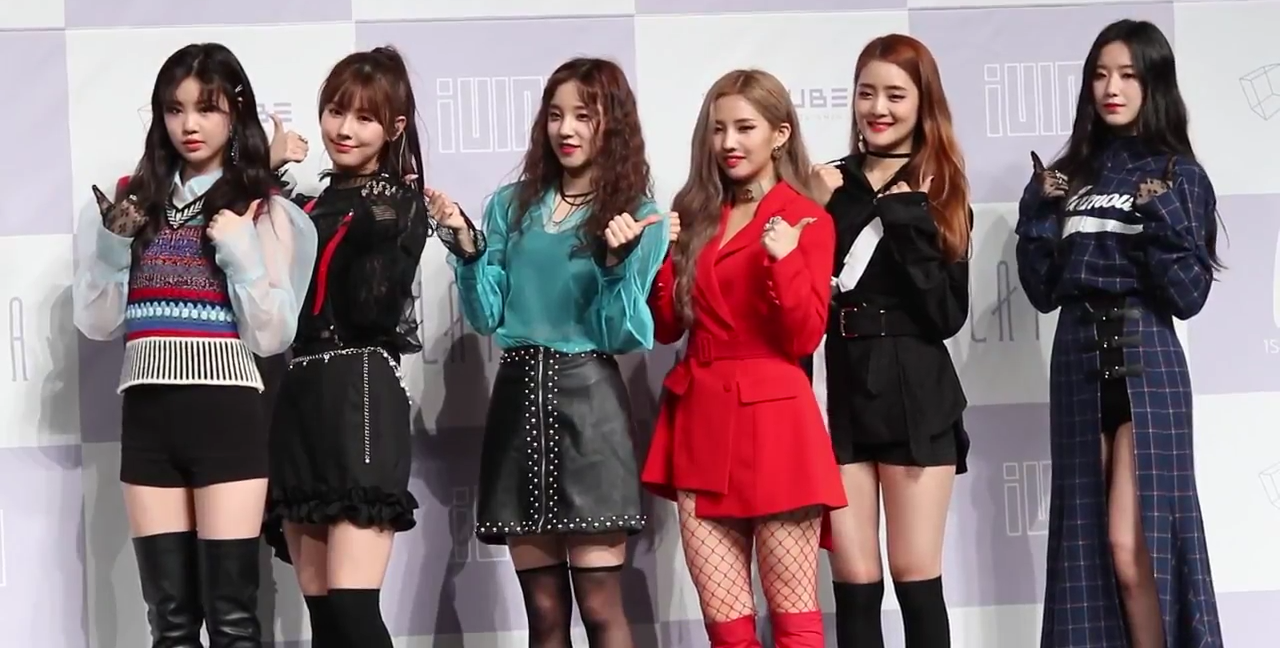
(G)I-dle at I Am showcase on May 2, 2018

(G)I-dle released their debut EP I Am on May 2, 2018, with "Latata" serving as lead single. The video for "Latata" exceeded 5.9 million views within the first week, and the EP debuted at number 13 on the Gaon Album Chart issued on May 10. I Am also debuted at number seven and peaked at number five on Billboard's World Albums chart on May 9. One week after release, "Latata" debuted at number 35 on Gaon Digital Chart on May 17. (G)I-dle received their first-ever music show win on SBS MTV's The Show on May 22, twenty days after their debut. On June 5, they entered Billboard's Social 50 Chart for the first time, charting at number 36. In June, a survey carried out between thirty-five participants in the South Korean music industry named (G)I-dle to the "Next Generation of K-pop" category with 39 points overall. On August 6, the group held a small concert and recorded a flash-mob performance of "Latata" in Times Square and Washington Square Park.

On August 14, (G)I-dle's first digital single "Hann (Alone)" was released. Within 24 hours, the music video surpassed 4.9 million views on YouTube. "Hann" topped domestic music charts including Bugs, Genie and Olleh Music on August 16 and peaked at number two on the Billboard World Digital Song Sales chart. (G)I-dle received their first music show win for the song on Show Champion on August 29. In September, the group made their first appearance at KCON in Thailand. In November 2018, Riot Games released the song "Pop/Stars" by a virtual girl group called K/DA, featuring vocals from Soyeon as Akali and Miyeon as Ahri alongside American singers Madison Beer and Jaira Burns. They performed the single at the League of Legends World Championship, and it reached number one on the Billboard World Digital Sales chart.

Throughout the rest of 2018, (G)I-dle won several rookie awards at major Korean year-end music award shows, including the Asia Artist Awards, Gaon Chart Music Awards, Genie Music Awards, Golden Disc Awards, Korea Popular Music Awards and Melon Music Awards.

=== 2019: I Made, "Uh-Oh", Japanese debut and Queendom ===
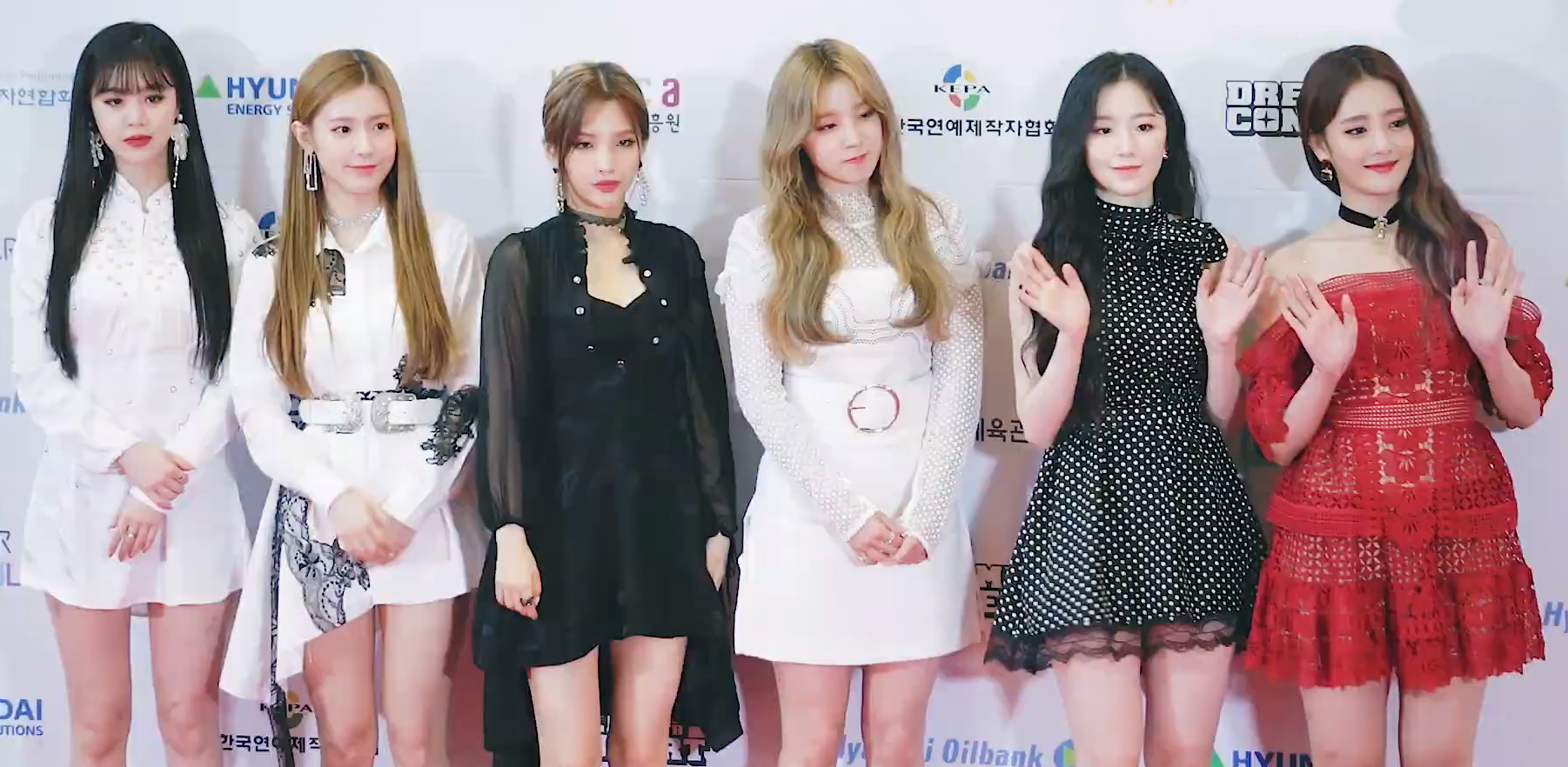
(G)I-dle at Dream Concert on May 18, 2019

(G)I-dle released their second EP, I Made, on February 26, 2019. The EP contains five songs, including the lead single "Senorita", written and composed by Soyeon and Big Sancho. On June 26, (G)I-dle released their second digital single, "Uh-Oh". The song ranked number 22 on NetEase Cloud Music China for the first half of 2019, making them the only K-pop group on the chart. In July, (G)I-dle held their first performance in the United States during the annual KCON convention and music festival at Javits Center, New York City. They later held a live showcase at the Mainabi Blitz Akasaka on July 23. The showcase sold over 1,000 tickets with 1,500 attendees. It was reported that around 15,000 people applied to attend, although many were unable to attend due to the venue's capacity. On July 31, (G)I-dle debuted in the Japanese market with the release of their EP Latata. On August 19, they collaborated with makeup brand Kate to release a spin-off music video of "Latata (Japanese ver.)".

(G)I-dle subsequently participated in a reality girl group survival show created by Mnet called Queendom. In the first preliminary round, (G)I-dle finished in first place after performing "Latata" re-imagined with a concept of shamanism. The introduction of the performance, Minnie's Thai "enchantment", was well received and was widely discussed among both Korean and Thai fans. In the second preliminary round, (G)I-dle reinterpreted 2NE1's "Fire" but finished in last place. In September, it was reported that Cube Entertainment would partner with e2PR and Strategic Communications to establish a new promotion team to handle (G)I-dle's international public relations. That same month, the group held their first fan meeting, Welcome to the Neverland, at the Yes24 Live Hall in Seoul. Tickets to the show sold out in two minutes.

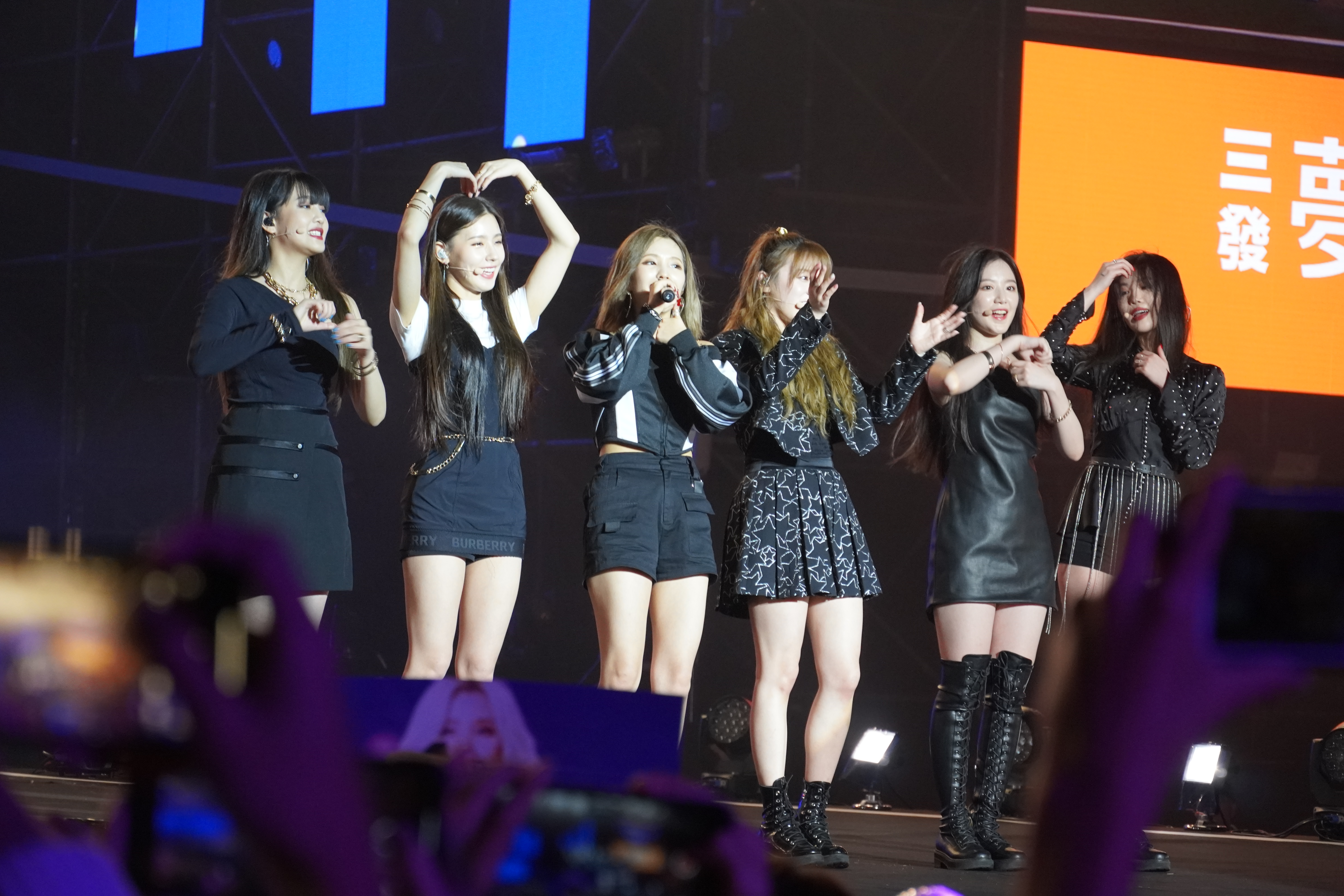
(G)I-dle at 2020 Tainan Christmas & New Year Eve Party on December 21, 2019

On October 4, (G)I-dle performed as a first-time headliner at the Spotify On Stage Jakarta. They were one of the six acts, including Rich Brian, Ateez, and others. On October 5, the group appeared on Immortal Songs 2, a KBS reality television singing competition, the group's first appearance on the program. They performed a rendition of Koyote's "Sad Dream" as a part of the group's 20th anniversary. (G)I-dle performed "Put It Straight (Nightmare Version)" for Queendom's Fan-dora's Box round. The stage performance reached one million views after fourteen hours of being released, and (G)I-dle placed fourth in the round. On October 25, (G)I-dle released "Lion" as part of the EP Queendom Final Comeback. By November 2019, the live performances of "Latata" and "Fire" surpassed 11 and 13 million views, respectively. On October 31, (G)I-dle finished the show in third place. "Lion" became a sleeper hit, gaining popularity due to their stage concept and re-entering real-time charts of various music sites. A music video for the song was released on November 4, surpassing five million views in two days. "Lion" debuted at number 13 on the World Digital Song Sales and peaked at number five. Meanwhile, the single rose eighty-nine spots to number 19 on the Gaon Digital Chart and topped China's QQ Music Korean Song chart for two consecutive weeks. On December 21, (G)I-dle performed their hit singles at the 2020 Tainan Christmas & New Year Eve Party at Tainan City, Taiwan. Their segment was the most-viewed of the event, with an audience of 80,000 people.

=== 2020: I Trust and Dumdi Dumdi ===
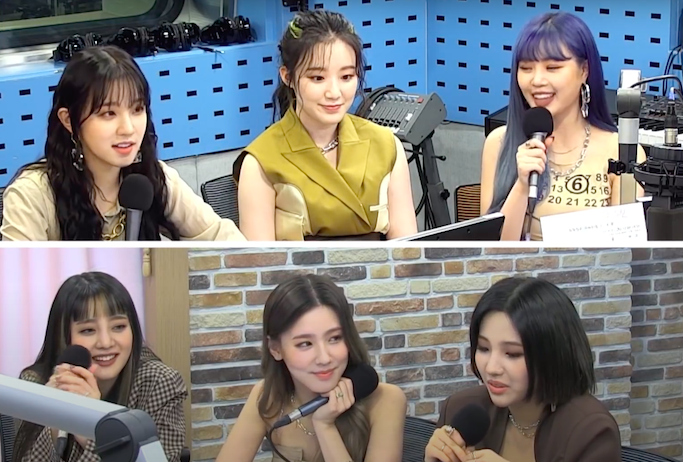
(G)I-dle at SBS Power FM for "Oh My God" promotions on April 21, 2020

On January 28, the group announced their first world tour I-Land: Who Am I, which would play in 32 different cities around the world. Later, it was announced their opening show in Bangkok and new album in mid-March were postponed due to the coronavirus outbreak to ensure the health and safety of the artists, fans, and staff. On January 31, the group appeared on Two Yoo Project Sugar Man 3 to perform Minnie's composed and rearranged version of "Show", originally Kim Won-jun. On March 26, (G)I-dle was announced as part of the lineup of the 2020 Twitch Stream Aid, a 12-hour live-streamed charity concert aiming to raise money for COVID-19 relief, on March 28. They were the first female K-pop group to participate.

On April 6, the group released their third EP titled I Trust with "Oh My God" as its lead single. The album consists of five songs, including an English-language version of the title track. In conjunction with the release of I Trust, (G)I-dle signed with Republic Records to help break into the American market. The album recorded over 91,311 pre-orders, making it their most pre-ordered EP, and became their highest-selling album, with 100,000 physical copies sold in three days. I Trust debuted atop the Gaon Album Chart, (G)I-dle's first number-one album in South Korea; achieved their highest-ever position on Billboard's World Albums chart at number four; and set a record for a South Korean girl group by topping the iTunes Top Albums chart in 62 countries worldwide. The music video for "Oh My God" broke their personal views record, amassing 17 million views within its first day of release. It later received a nomination for Best K-Pop Video at the 2020 MTV Video Music Awards. The song also marked the first time the group appeared on the Scottish Singles Chart and charted at number 97, becoming only the third K-pop artist and the second female act to appear on the chart. (G)I-dle's live promotions for "Oh My God" won four music show awards, including their first grand slam public broadcast win on KBS's Music Bank, SBS's Inkigayo and MBC's Show! Music Core. On May 6, (G)I-dle entered Rolling Stone's Top 25 Breakthrough chart as the only K-pop group to chart for the month of April at the top 20 spot with a unit growth of 3.3 million and over 5.5 million total on demand audio streams in the U.S.

In May, (G)I-dle released the official English version of their debut song "Latata" on May 15. On May 31, the group announced that they would be joining the 32-artist lineup at KCON:TACT 2020 Summer on June 23. The group was expected to release two albums in the second half of the year, including a digital single, according to an EBest Investment & Securities Co., Ltd researcher. (G)I-dle held I-Land: Who Am I as an online pay-per-view concert scheduled on July 5 instead of what would have been their first world tour. They performed songs from their debut album as well as "I'm the Trend", composed by Minnie and Yuqi, to a live audience of 11,000 real-time viewers. Subsequently, the group released the digital single, along with its music video on July 7 as a special present for their fans.

On August 3, (G)I-dle released their first single album Dumdi Dumdi, with a lead single of the same name. With the release, Dumdi Dumdi ranked as the second best-selling girl group single album in history, with 94,587 initial sales. However, the song had a slow rise on the Gaon and Billboard charts. It debuted at numbers 27 and 15 on the Gaon Digital Chart and the US Billboard World Digital Song Sales chart and later peaked at numbers eight and 13, respectively. On iTunes, the song topped in 42 regions in the world. The music video for "Dumdi Dumdi" garnered over 17.6 million views in a single day, breaking their previous record with "Oh My God". The group ended promotions winning first place for two weeks in a row on Show Champion, M Countdown and Inkigayo, making "Dumdi Dumdi" the group's most-winning title track. On August 26, they made their first Japanese comeback with the release of their second EP, Oh My God, along with the Japanese versions of "Oh My God", "Uh-Oh", "Senorita", "Dumdi Dumdi" and an original Japanese track titled "Tung Tung (Empty)", composed by Minnie. On August 27, (G)I-dle resprised their roles as Akali and Ahri in K/DA for the song "The Baddest", featuring American singers Bea Miller and Wolftyla. It was also announced that they were to be featured on the title track "More" with the original lineup Beer and Burns, along with Chinese singer Lexie Liu, released on October 28. Both songs charted at number one on Billboard World Digital Song Sales and were included in K/DA's first EP All Out.

In November, (G)I-dle held an online fan meeting, called GBC in the Neverland, through Global Interpark; "GBC" is the shortened title for "(G)I-dle Broadcast Club". At the end of the year, (G)I-dle's I-Land: Who Am I concert ranked at number eight for Interpark's Annual Concert in 2020 and the second highest selling online music concert behind Iz*One Online Concert "Oneiric Theater", which ranked fourth overall. (G)I-dle was the tenth most-streamed K-pop artist on Spotify in 2020.

=== 2021: I Burn and Soojin's departure ===
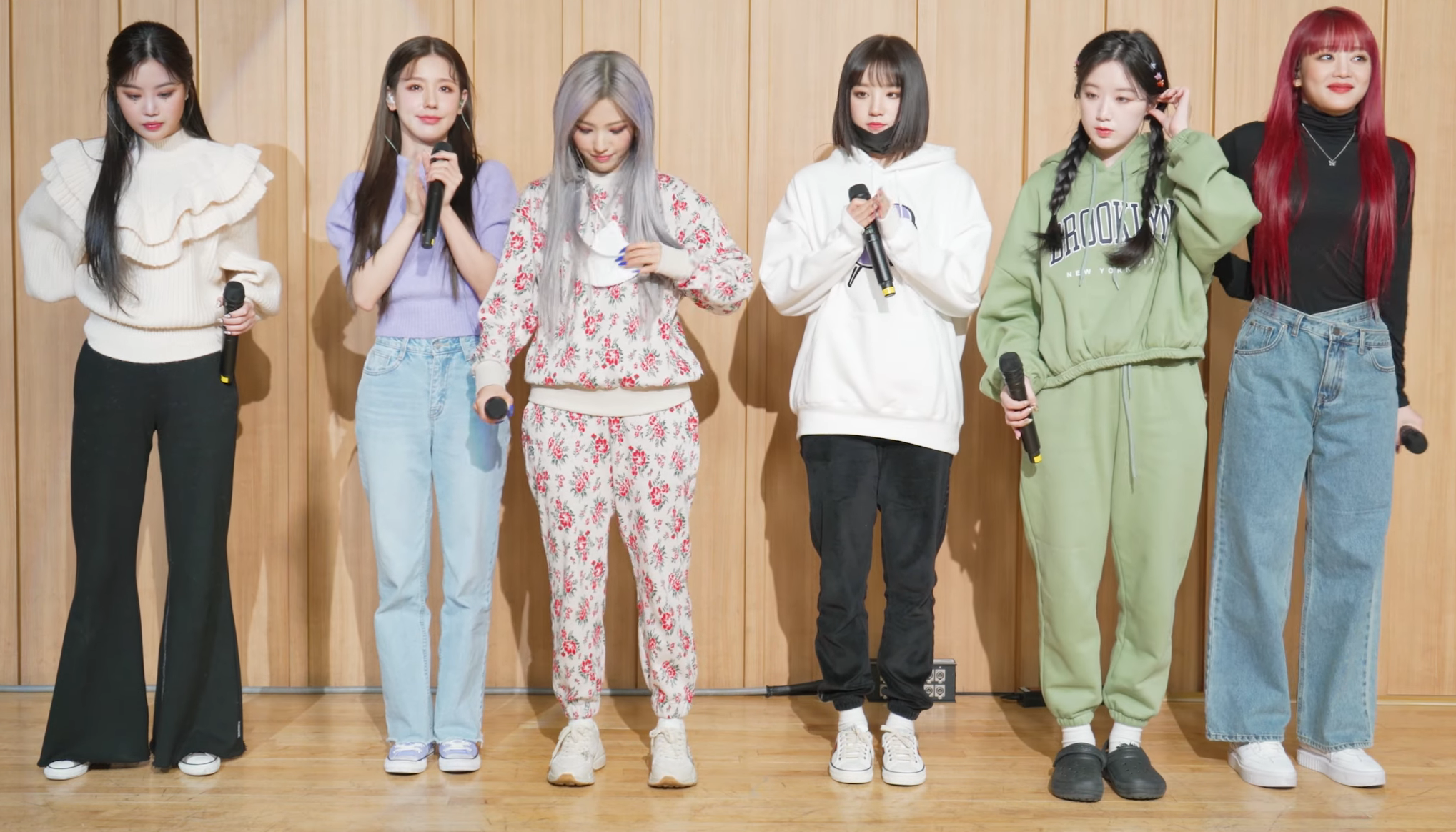
(G)I-dle performing "Hwaa" live at SBS Power FM's Cultwo Show on January 14, 2021.

On January 11, the group released their fourth EP, I Burn, with its lead single, "Hwaa". According to Hanteo Chart, I Burn debuted at number one on the daily album chart with 75,510 copies sold. The album also debuted atop the Gaon Retail Album Chart, with 59,086 copies sold. The music video for "Hwaa" reached 10 million YouTube views in 29 hours. Two days later, the album was reported to have charted on the iTunes Top Album charts in 51 countries, including the Netherlands, New Zealand, Canada, Russia, Brazil, Italy and Finland. For the first time since their debut in 2018, all songs from I Burn was charted on the Melon chart. "Hwaa" topped domestic charts and attained commercial success on Billboard charts, peaking at number five on K-pop Hot 100 and number eight on World Digital Songs. The song also topped on NetEase Music's real-time chart and weekly K-pop chart for two consecutive weeks after release. "Hwaa" also achieved 10 music show wins, the most since their debut in 2018; (G)I-dle was also awarded a triple crown for "Hwaa". On January 27, (G)I-dle released the official English and Chinese versions of "Hwaa". Songwriting credits for the Chinese version of "Hwaa" were given to Yuqi, the group's Chinese member. On February 5, (G)I-dle released a version of "Hwaa" remixed by Dimitri Vegas & Like Mike, the band's first collaboration with foreign artists.

On March 4, it was announced that Soojin would go on hiatus following alleged bullying accusations from former classmates. On April 29, (G)I-dle released the song "Last Dance" alongside Universe. Due to Soojin's hiatus, Universe and Cube Entertainment redistributed her vocal parts amongst the remaining five active members. The single peaked at number 142 on the Gaon Digital Chart and at number 16 on the Billboard World Digital Songs Sales chart. Yuqi became the second (G)I-dle member to debut as a soloist, with the release of her debut single album A Page on May 13. The album consists of two lead singles, "Giant" and "Bonnie and Clyde", with the concept of "A page of Yuqi's autobiography story and endless possibilities".

On May 21, it was announced that Soyeon was in the final stages of preparing for her comeback, slated for a June release. She released her first solo EP Windy on July 5. On August 14, Cube Entertainment announced that Soojin departed from the group and that (G)I-dle would continue as five-member group thereafter.

=== 2022: I Never Die, first world tour and I Love ===
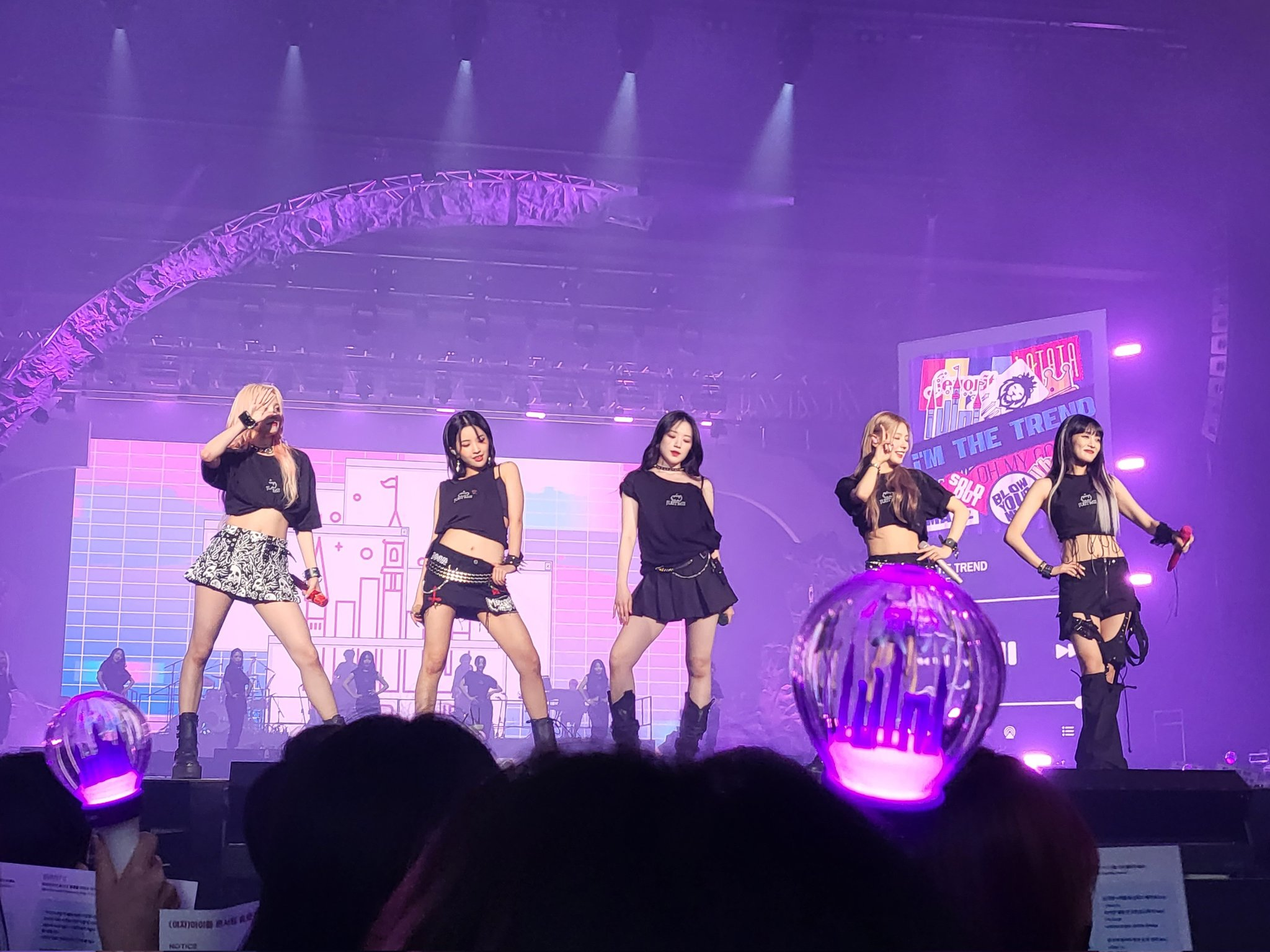
(G)I-dle during day 1 of Just Me ( )I-dle—Seoul at Olympic Hall on June 17, 2022.

On January 17, (G)I-dle performed as a five-member group for the first time as part of the Expo 2020 in Dubai on South Korea's country day. On February 24, it was announced that (G)I-dle would return with their first studio album, I Never Die, and its lead single, "Tomboy" on March 14, their first release as a five-member group. The album's lead single "Tomboy" became the group's first chart-topper in South Korea on both the Gaon Digital Chart, the K-pop Hot 100 as well as South Korea's Billboard, where it remained for two, three and two consecutive weeks, respectively. On March 24, the group managed to achieve perfect all-kills, where a song topped on the top 100 in several domestic music sites. Collectively, it spent 167 hourly becoming the second group to achieve PAK that year.

The B-side track "My Bag" became the group's highest charting B-side, peaking at twenty-two on the weekly Gaon Digital Chart, thirty-four on the K-pop Hot 100, and nine on South Korea's Billboard chart. The success of "Tomboy" and the popularity of its their point choreography became noted as the "Tomboy Syndrome" by some domestic media outlets. The music video recorded 10 million views within 16 hours of release and reached 100 million views about fifty days later. That same month, the group released a remix version of the song by Dutch-Moroccan DJ R3hab on May 20. A visualizer video for this remix was released to R3hab's YouTube channel on the same day. "Tomboy" point choreography was voted first place for the most addictive point choreography. The 'ILY sign', folding the middle and ring fingers with both hands and then shaking it crosswise, became a dance craze imitated by many celebrities and dance teams domestically and internationally. The "Tomboy Challenge" hashtag videos recorded more than 100 million views on TikTok. The song then achieved 100 million streams on Spotify in September. I Never Die was selected as one of Time magazine's The Best Albums of 2022. The magazine wrote that "Tomboy" was "one of the most commercially successful K-pop songs of 2022", and the album I Never Die "deserves its own recognition". Additionally, Billboard ranked "Tomboy" at the topped of the list for The 25 Best K-Pop Songs of 2022.

Miyeon became the group's third soloist with the release of her first EP, My, on April 27. (G)I-dle began their first world tour, Just Me ( )I-dle, starting in South Korea, the United States, Chile, Mexico, Bangkok, Indonesia, Kuala Lumpur, the Philippines, Japan, and Singapore. The tickets to the show at Olympic Hall in Olympic Park, Seoul on June 18 and 19 was sold-out after the opening of pre-sale tickets. Cube then opened an additional Seoul concert schedule on June 17 and was also sold-out within three minutes.

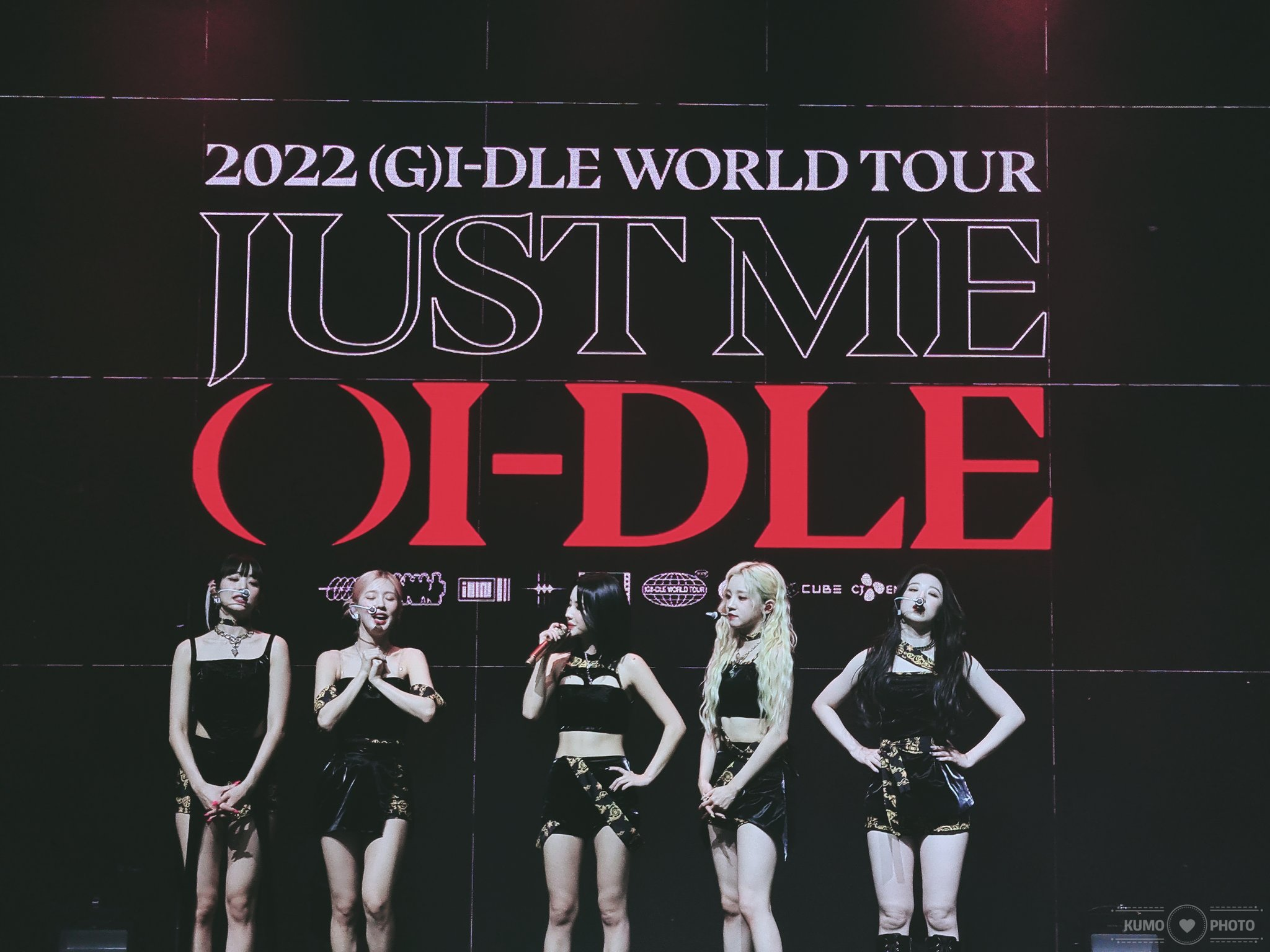
(G)I-dle at Showcenter Complex, Monterrey, Mexico on August 14, 2022

On September 14, it was announced that (G)I-dle is scheduled to release their fifth Korean EP, I Love, on October 17. The album took the form of a vintage Hollywood-inspired concept and was heavily inspired by the late actress Marilyn Monroe. The lead single, "Nxde", topped all real-time charts in South Korea and achieved their second perfect all-kill (PAK) of 2022, making (G)I-dle the fourth group in K-pop history to have multiple PAKs within the same year, after 2NE1 (2011), Big Bang (2015) and Twice (2016). In Taiwan, the song topped the Billboard Taiwan Songs. In the United States, "Nxde" ranked at number 39 on Mediabase Top 40 Radio airplay charts and debuted at number 40 on the US Billboard Pop Airplay chart, making them the first act from an independent label to chart with a non-English song. The album became a commercial success for the group, recording number seventy-one on the Billboard 200, ranked first in 40 countries worldwide in the iTunes Top Album category, surpassed 678,000 copies in Initial Chodong sales, and recorded a growth rate of about 284% from previous released. The music video for "Nxde" garnered 24 million views within 24 hours of its release, and exceeded 100 million views on the seventeenth day (November 4) of release, breaking the record for the shortest period among fourth-generation girl groups. The music video became (G)I-dle's eighth music video with 100 million views, setting a record for the most song to achieve that milestone by a fourth-generation girl group. The song earned twelve music show wins and first place for three consecutive weeks on Show! Music Core and Inkigayo, making it the group's most wins after "Hwaa" (2021).

On December 16, (G)I-dle collaborated with Steve Aoki for a remix version of "Nxde". A visualizer video for the song was released the same day. On December 31, (G)I-dle released For Neverland, an interactive virtual reality (VR) concert released for free, exclusively on Pico Video in ten countries, including Malaysia. Pico produces the show in collaboration with Vive Studios, a leading AI-based metaverse content art tech company in Korea, making this the first interactive VR K-pop concert. (G)I-dle was the tenth most-streamed K-pop artists globally and fourth most-streamed K-pop girl group globally on Spotify in 2022.

=== 2023: I Feel, second world tour and Heat ===
In 2023, (G)I-dle made their Taiwan television debut with their appearance on Taiwan's broadcaster TTV Chinese New Year's Eve special program, 2023 Super Star as South Korea representative and the finale act of the show. On April 18, it was announced that (G)I-dle would release their sixth Korean EP, I Feel on May 15, followed by an accompanying world tour, I am Free-ty, which started in Seoul on June 17. The album's release was accompanied by the pre-release single "Allergy" and the lead single "Queencard". Both songs peaked within the top 20 of Circle Chart, with "Queencard" peaking at number one and becoming the group's third single to achieve a perfect all-kill on Korean music charts. I Feel was the 14th best-selling album worldwide in 2023 according to the International Federation of the Phonographic Industry (IFPI), selling two million copies.

On July 10, it was announced that (G)I-dle would be collaborating with 88rising to release their first English EP Heat on October 5. The first single off of Heat, "I Do", was released on July 13. The EP Heat was released on October 5 alongside the second single "I Want That", accompanied by its music video. On November 9, it was confirmed that Soyeon would be part of a special collaboration single "Nobody" with Ive's Liz and Aespa's Winter, which was released on November 16.

=== 2024: 2, I Sway, third world tour and contract renewal ===
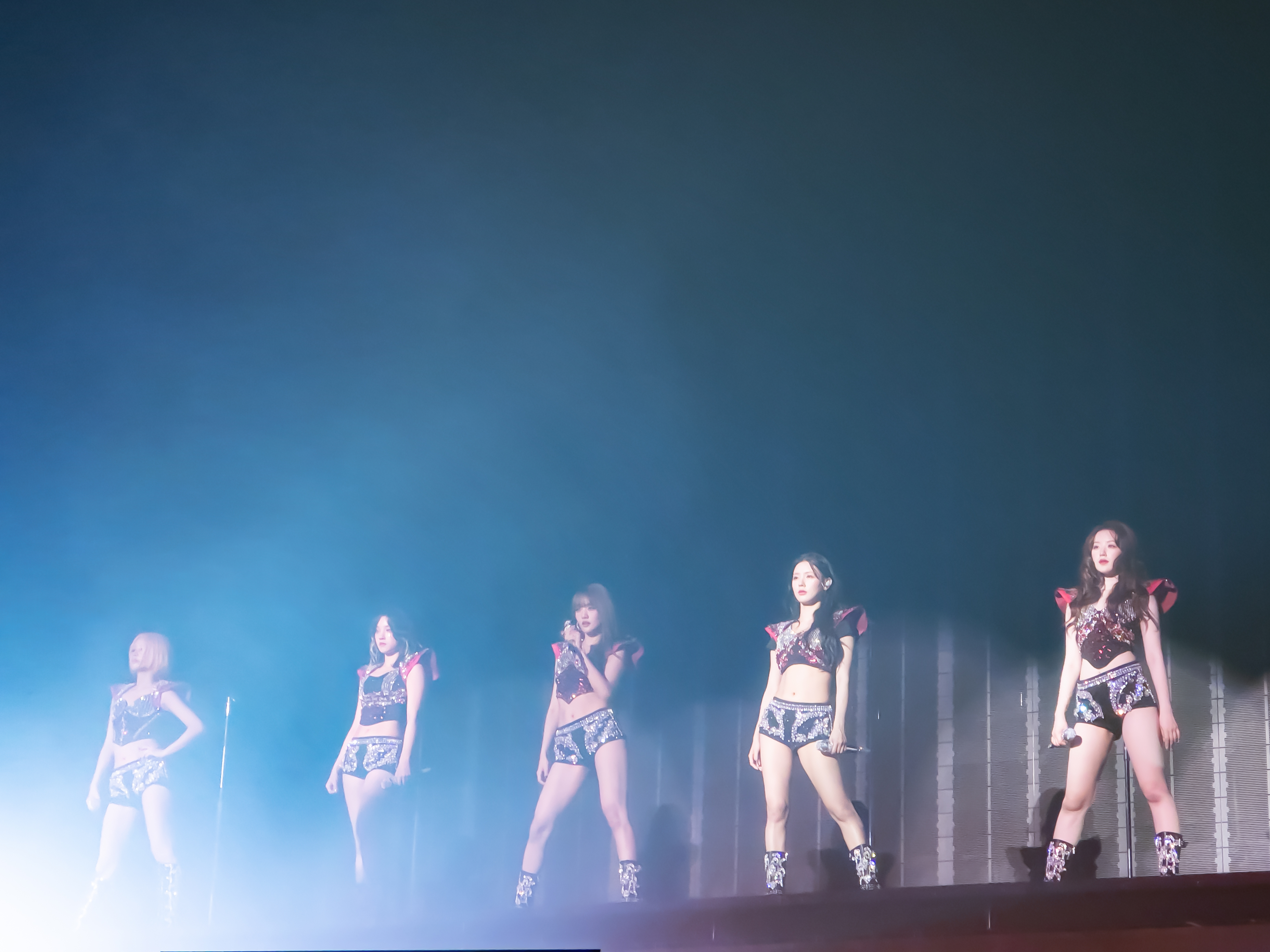
(G)I-dle performing in Tacoma during the I-dol World Tour in 2024

On January 7, 2024, it was announced that (G)I-dle would be releasing their second studio album titled 2 on January 29. The pre-release single "Wife", which would be part of the album, was released on January 22. Following growing popularity on social media site TikTok, the track "Fate" achieved a perfect all-kill on the Korean charts, making (G)I-dle the first ever K-pop girl group to achieve perfect all-kills with four consecutive comebacks. On March 15, the group was featured in American singer Jennifer Lopez's single "This Time Around".

On May 13, Cube Entertainment announced that (G)I-dle would be embarking on their third world tour, I-dol, which kicked off in Seoul on August 3 and 4. On June 10, it was announced that the group's seventh Korean EP I Sway would be released on July 8. The lead single "Klaxon" and its accompanying music video were released along with the EP. On December 2, during a speech at the 2024 Melon Music Awards, Soyeon revealed that all five members had renewed their contracts with Cube Entertainment.

=== 2025: Rebranding as I-dle, We Are I-dle and We Are ===
The logo of I-dle since May 2025

On May 2, 2025, Cube Entertainment announced that the group would officially be rebranded as I-dle, marking their seventh anniversary since debut. A special EP We Are I-dle was later released on the same day, containing five-member versions for nine of their previously released singles. The group's eighth Korean EP We Are was released on May 19.

On October 3, I-dle released their first Japanese EP since rebranding, I-dle, with the lead single "Where Do We Go" (どうしよっかな, Dōshi yokka na; lit. 'What should I do?'). Prior to the EP's release, the Japanese version of "Fate" was pre-released as a single on September 26. On December 3, Cube Entertainment announced that the group would be embarking on their fourth world tour, Syncopation in 2026, kicking off on February 21 and 22 in Seoul at the KSPO Dome.

=== 2026–present: We Made ===
In January 2026, it was announced that I-dle would release the digital single "Mono", featuring British rapper and record producer Skaiwater, on January 27. On June 8, the group announced the release of their ninth EP, We Made, releasing on July 6. The pre-release single "Crow" from the EP was released on June 15.

== Members ==
=== Current ===
- Miyeon (미연) – vocalist
- Minnie (민니) – vocalist
- Soyeon (소연) – leader, rapper
- Yuqi (우기) – vocalist, dancer
- Shuhua (슈화) – vocalist

=== Former ===
- Soojin (수진; 2018–2021) – dancer, rapper, vocalist

== Image and artistry ==
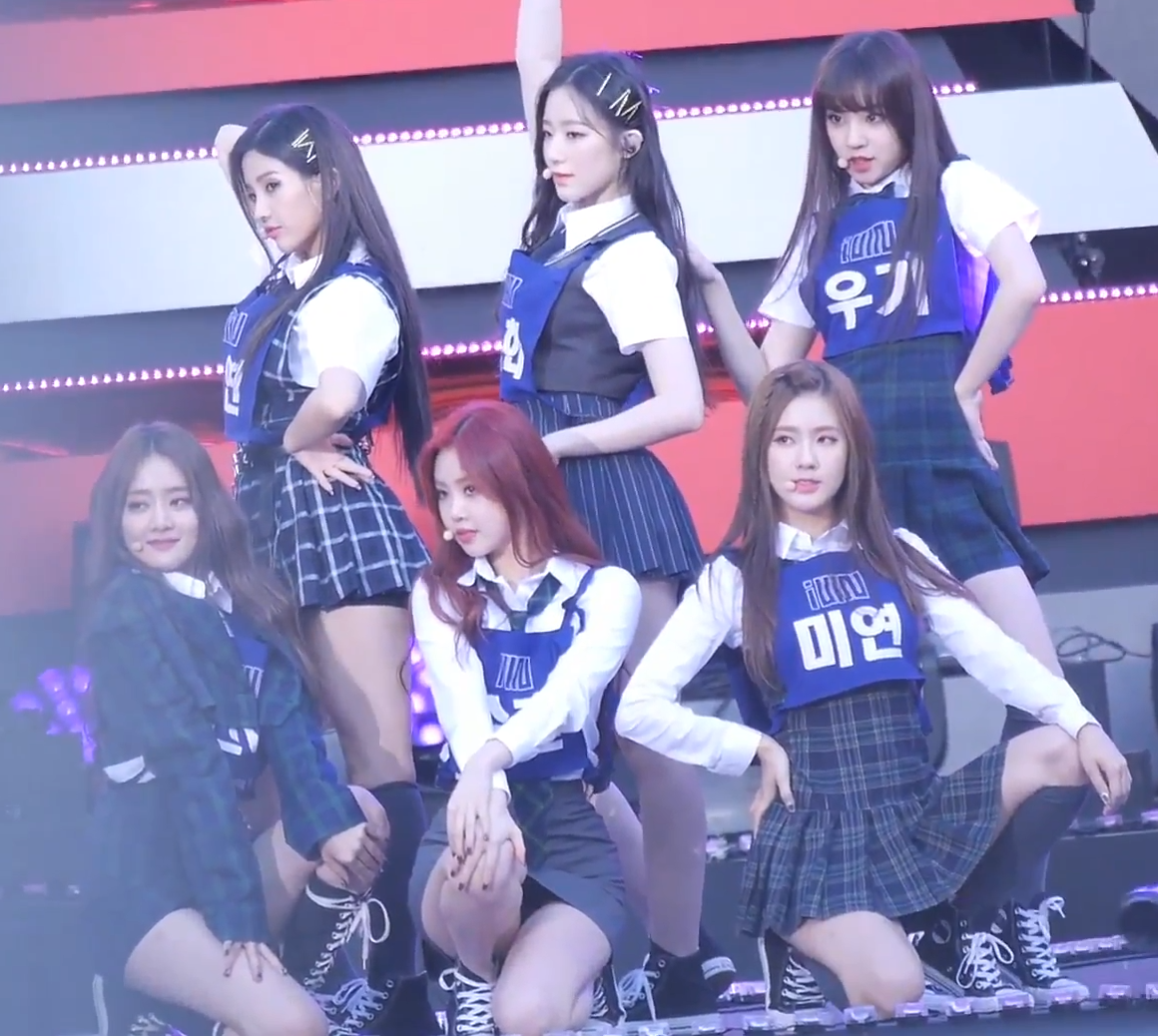
(G)I-dle performing their cover of 4Minute's "Hot Issue" in September 2018

=== Image ===
(G)I-dle have been praised for their musicality and ambiguity. According to industry specialists and marketing researchers, the group was noted to embody the spirit a group like 2NE1 once had, adapted to today's sensibilities.

The group has been recognized for being a "self-producing" idol group, breaking stereotypes of female idols with their unique concepts, and their vocal colours. The youngest group to appear on Queendom, the members were actively involved in conceptualizing their own music videos, jacket photoshoots, song arrangements, choreography, and outfits. Instead of appealing to the opposite sex with their femininity, (G)I-dle instead cultivated a fanbase, collectively referred to as "Neverland", backed by a high number of women and girls; around 70% of listeners of "Oh My God" on Melon were female.

Natalie Morin from Refinery29 described (G)I-dle as a group of individuals with different but complementary energies. She called them "bold and sensual", characteristics which she opined set them apart from other K-pop girl groups. Mor.bo complemented their sonic diversity and willingness to try different musical styles. Elle magazine named the group "independent musicians and artists", contrary to typical girl groups' concepts that work within a mould made by someone else. Idology describes the members of (G)I-dle as "good actors, which is something that idols need to be in order to express a variety of stories and emotions" with "a strong determination to show something different and benefited from being able to produce themselves". Chun Yoon-Hye of Herald Pop called (G)I-dle "a group filled with skills and confidence" who "engraved their presence by successfully expressing their exceptional concepts during Queendom" and "gone from super rookie to trending girl group". Choi Ji-sun, a pop music critic and author, discussed how the music industry limited idols, especially female ones, and named (G)I-dle and their performance of "Lion" on Mnet's Queendom as an example of change. Choi praised the song as a "rare case of calling a female wild beast" and stating that he enjoyed "Soyeon's leading creativity" and how they were "integrating the message and the stage". BBC World Service named the group as one of girl groups breaking gender stereotypes.

=== Influences ===
(G)I-dle revealed that they deemed Hyuna, then their labelmate and senior, as a role model in May 2018. Yuqi stated, "I grew up dreaming of becoming a singer after seeing Hyuna sunbae-nim. I want to become a sexy and cute singer like [her]. My mother played her music during preschool. That seems to have influenced me." Shuhua also noted, "Since I was young, I loved dancing with my friends. I want to stand on stage together." (G)I-dle also revealed that a group whom they respect and were influenced by them as an artist is the South Korean boy band BTS, "who helped and introduced so many people to so many artists — We would like to also strive for a similar path."

=== Musical style, themes, and stage ===
(G)I-dle's songs have explored many genres, including various styles of moombahton ("Latata", "Hann (Alone)", and "Dumdi Dumdi"), Latin pop ("Senorita"), boom bap ("Uh-Oh"), and urban hip hop ("Oh My God"). In the idol industry saturated with songs with themes of love and farewell, the group's song "Lion" diverges from the characteristics of a typical girl group song with lyrics that compare one's dignity to that of a lion. On I Trust, the group further experimented with elements of EDM trap, hip hop and urban music, with themes of self-love and self-trust. Taylor Glasby of MTV said that (G)I-dle songs are "steeped in their very essence—a girl's complex, internal house of mirrors constantly being broken, assessed, understood, and remade, where one style or sound is never enough to reflect who they are". She praised the group's eclectic musical identity and how their lyrics "push back" and can be either "can be boring nonchalance or sharpening desire". Writing for Herald Pop, Kim Na-yul stated that (G)I-dle's music can only be performed by them and that they made a good impression on the public.

Melon's magazine described (G)I-dle's unique music as their "most powerful weapon". Korea JoongAng Daily journalist Yoo Seong-woon complimented the group for blending elements from different sources into a unique mix of concepts and creating something new and fresh for the K-pop idol scene. Divyansha Dongre of Rolling Stone India pointed out that "Symbolism is a staple in (G)I-dle's discography" it would be "incomplete without deep symbolism and metaphors". He describes that "Hwaa['s] chronological advancement from winter to bloom and fire effortlessly symbolizes the journey of a heartbroken person who gradually opened up to the idea of love again" and the symbolism and metaphors in "Lion"'s music video. "Dumdi Dumdi" was praised as having carried the legacy of summer songs. (G)I-dle's 2022 hit song, "Tomboy" is a song that stands out with straightforward lyrics that fully reveal (G)I-dle's confident attitude.

The group has also been praised for their stage presence; their Cleopatra-inspired stage at 2018 Melon Music Awards, their female-focused performance at the 2018 Mnet Asian Music Awards, and their emotional acting demonstration at Fan-dora's Box are often cited as examples of their range and abilities as performers. (G)I-dle's performance of "Lion" on Queendom featured a storyline narrated by Minnie, choreography in golden robes ornately decorated with a lion's mane, and an outro with a herd of lion dancers following (G)I-dle to six thrones. It was described as "world-class" and "legendary" and won the group several performance awards, including at Golden Disc Awards.

== Impact ==
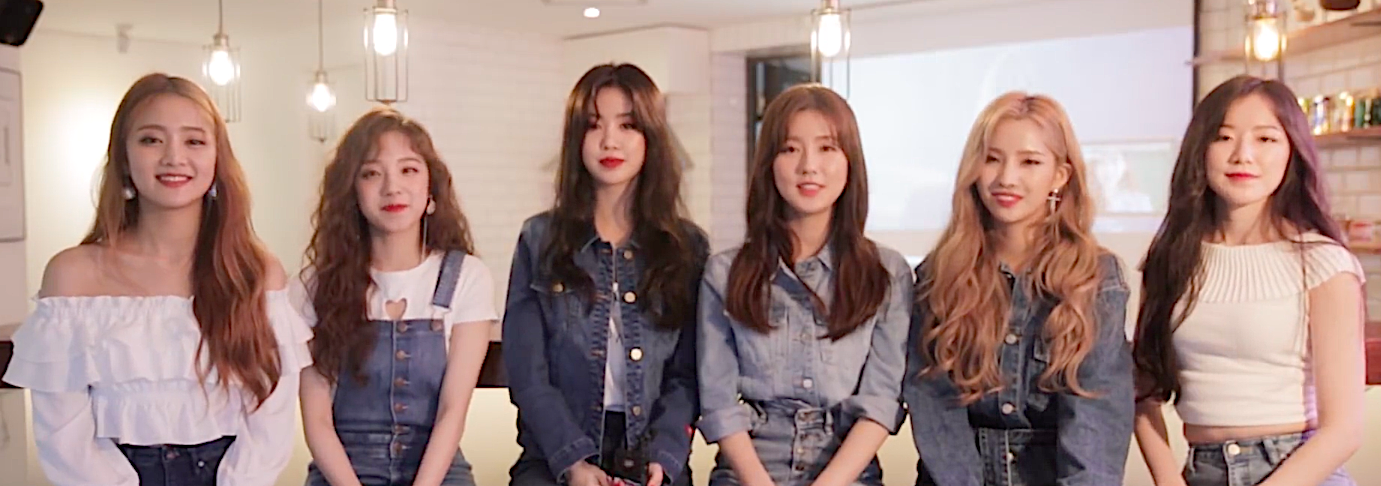
(G)I-dle for summer magazine photoshoot, July 2018

(G)I-dle have been recognized for their brand recognition and marketing power, topping the "Girl Group Brand Power Ranking" published by the Korean Business Research Institute in June and September 2018, and peaking in brand reputation index in September 2018. They were dubbed the "monster rookie" of 2018, and Billboard ranked them at the top of its list as the best new K-pop acts of 2018. It was reported that Cube Entertainment's music sales in 2018 increased by 58% to ₩8.8 billion due to the popularity of (G)I-dle's "Latata" and "Hann (Alone)".

In 2019, (G)I-dle gained further recognition from the general public after appearing on Queendom. The performance of their finale song "Lion" was considered one of K-pop's biggest moments of 2019 by CTV News and resulted in them topping the "Girl Group Brand Power Ranking" for two consecutive months in October and November 2019. Rolling Stone India included "Lion" in their list of the 10 best K-pop music videos of 2019 and named it the third-best K-pop Feminist Anthems Perfect for Women's Day as it "[symbolizes] the fierce leadership, fighter and survivor instincts exhibited by women". The song was considered by Billboard "one of the most visceral tracks of 2019" and topped the list of songs released in 2019.

In January 2020, (G)I-dle was voted one of the most anticipated artists in 2020 based on surveys of several Korean music agencies, broadcasting and program officials, composers and popular music critics. In February, the group achieved number one in ranking brand power with the most-interacted topics, "Lion", and world touring. According to Hyundai Motors Investment Firm, during the coronavirus pandemic, Cube Entertainment target shares increased by 36.67% due to (G)I-dle's growth with "Oh My God". On August 13, the label released a report of their earnings in the second quarter of the year; the sales in their record and broadcasting sectors rose by 349% (₩2 billion) from one year earlier as a result of I Trust, which sold 151,108 copies, the success of their I-Land: Who Am I concert, and Dumdi Dumdi's 98,587 sales. The same month, (G)I-dle surpassed 500 million streams on Spotify, becoming the first fourth-generation K-pop girl group to reach this mark. On August 26, it was reported that they were the first K-pop group to be interviewed by Forbes China.

In February 28, 2023, the label released a report of their total earnings of 2022; the label's consolidated sales increased by 68% to ₩120.6 billion in total due to the popularity of "Tomboy", "Nxde" and its albums I Never Die and I Love, as well as the group's tour and advertisements. In 2022, (G)I-dle topped the annual NetEase Cloud Music chart in China, recorded more than one million total sales for two albums, I Never Die and I Love, and sold ¥20 million (approximately ₩3.7 billion).

(G)I-dle has been named an influence by female artists such as Dal Shabet's Park Subin, former Wonder Girls' Yubin, STAYC's Yoon, and Pixy's Lola.

== Other ventures ==
=== Ambassadorship ===
Seoul Metropolitan City appointed (G)I-dle as the city's goodwill ambassadors, alongside Yura, Park Jin-hee, and eight other nominees on December 6, 2018. The group held the title "City Ambassadors" for two years. At the tenth annual Children's Diabetes Celebration Festival held at Lotte World Underground Kingdom on June 8, 2019, in Eunpyeong District, Seoul, they were named the new ambassadors for Korean Children's Diabetes Association.

=== Endorsements ===
In 2019, (G)I-dle began endorsing Kaja, a beauty brand by Sephora and Memebox to create a new form combining K-Beauty and K-pop. The reality TV series To Neverland and the "Senorita" music video were released through the partnership. In 2020, Akiii Classic selected (G)I-dle as new models to reinforce the sensitivity of Gen Z's culture and trends pioneering the brand image. In early April 2020, the group was revealed as promotional models for South Korea's largest contact lens brand, LensMe. A representative from LensMe explained that the group's unique music and charismatic stage performances matched well with their "Basic, Trendy, Easy" company image. When choosing (G)I-dle as their models, the high fashion brand LipHop—emerging among young people predominantly in South Korea, United States, Thailand, and Japan—stated that they considered the group to be "global artists who boast confident music and attractive visuals". In July 2023, (G)I-dle became the advertising model of Samyang Foods' global campaign for their buldak-flavored instant noodles, "Play Buldak". In October 2023, (G)-I-dle collaborated with Australian deodorant brand Rexona as the new faces of its Glow For It campaign, introducing its Vitamin+Bright product range in Southeast Asia.

=== Philanthropy ===
On April 22, 2020, (G)I-dle donated 30,000 bottles of hand sanitizer worth ₩100 million through Holt Children's Services for children and their families impacted by the COVID-19 pandemic in South Korea. For the release of Dumdi Dumdi in August 2020, (G)I-dle took part in Naver's Happybean Good Action event. Donations collected through the campaign were used to support psychological and mental health counseling treatment, snacks and nutritional kits for medical staff through Sports Doctors during the pandemic.

== Discography ==
- I Never Die (2022)
- 2 (2024)

== Concerts and tours ==
=== Headlining tour ===
- Just Me ( )I-dle World Tour (2022)
- I Am Free-ty World Tour (2023)
- I-dol World Tour (2024)
- I-dle First Japan Tour (2025)
- Syncopation World Tour (2026)

=== Headlining concert ===
- 2020 (G)I-dle Online Concert 'I-Land: Who Am I' (2020)
- 2022 Virtual Reality Concert 'For Neverland' (2022)
- 2024 Head in the Clouds Festival (2024)

== Filmography ==
=== Television shows ===
Year	Title	Ref.
2019	Queendom	
2020	Life Co LTD (인생주식회사)	

=== Web shows ===
Year	Title	Note	Ref.
2018–present	(G)I-dle: I-Talk	Premiered on May 3, 2018	
2018	(G)I-dle: Vlog in New York		
2019	To Neverland	6 episodes premiered on M2	
2019	(G)I-dle: Little but Certain Happiness (소확행)	Premiered on June 17, 2019	
2020–present	(G)I-dle: #Hashtalk	Premiered on January 6, 2020	
2020	(G)I-dle: Secret Folder (유출금지)	Collaboration special with 1theK	
2020	(G)I-dle Live: I-Live		
2020	(G)I-dle X Star Road	Collaboration special with Dispatch	
2020	Never Ending Neverland (네버엔딩 네버랜드)	Premiered on July 21, 2020	
2020	Idol Workshop (아이돌 워크숍)		
2021	Ssap-Dance		
2021	K-Pop Evolution		
2022–present	(G)I-dle: I-Log	Premiered on May 5, 2022	
2022	(G)I-DLE GGULlog-zam ((여자)아이들 꿀로그잼)		
2022	A Gift Box for (G)I-DLE ((여자)아이들 외 취급주의)	5 episodes premiered on Amazon Prime Channel K and Seezn	
2022	Treatment of (G)I-DLE 2	Premiered on Seezn	
2022	Just Me ( )I-dle	Premiered on July 29, 2022	
2023	Up To (G)I-dle	Premiered on March 22, 2023	
2023	I Am Free-ty	Premiered on August 18, 2023	
2024	Jingle Ball 2023	Premiered on January 3, 2024	
2024	I-dol	Premiered on September 27, 2024	
2025	Up to I-dle	Premiered on June 5, 2025	

=== Radio shows ===
Year	Title	Notes	Ref.
2021	Gossip Idle	January 5, 12 and 19, 2021	
2021	Not that Close	5.02 MHz	

== Awards and nominations ==
(G)I-dle received their first music show win on SBS MTV's The Show with "Latata" on May 22, 2018. They won their first new artist award, "Female Rookie Idol of the Year", on July 24, 2018, at the Brand of the Year Awards, and went on to receive a total of seven rookie awards at various awards ceremonies in their debut year. In 2020, (G)I-dle received a nomination for Best K-Pop Video at the 37th MTV Video Music Awards. In 2021, (G)I-dle received a nomination for K-pop Bomb at Nickelodeon Mexico Kids' Choice Awards.

== See also ==
- List of best-selling girl group albums
