= Good Thing (I-dle song) =

Single by I-dle

from the EP We Are
- Language: Korean; English
- Released: May 19, 2025
- Length: 2:34
- Label: Cube; Kakao
- Composers: Soyeon; Pop Time; Daily; Likey
- Lyricist: Soyeon

I-dle singles chronology
"Klaxon" (2024)	"Good Thing" (2025)	"Fate" (Japanese ver.) (2025)

Music video
- "Good Thing" on YouTube

Professional ratings
Review scores
Source	Rating
IZM	2/5 stars

"Good Thing" is a song recorded by South Korean girl group I-dle for their eighth Korean extended play We Are. It was released as the EP's lead single by Cube Entertainment on May 19, 2025.

== Background and release ==
On May 2, 2025, Cube Entertainment announced that I-dle's eighth Korean extended play would be released on May 19. On May 7, the tracklist for the extended play was released, with "Good Thing" announced as one of the six tracks. With the release of two music video teasers on May 16, "Good Thing" was confirmed to be the lead single. The song was released alongside its music video upon the release of the extended play on May 19.

== Composition ==
"Good Thing" was written, composed, and arranged by Soyeon, with Pop Time, Daily, and Likey participating in the composition and arrangement. The song is described as having "retro-sounding instruments and witty 8-bit sounds", featuring "cool and confident lyrics unique to I-dle" with repetitive phrases like "good thing" and "holy moly shhh" adding to its addictive quality. Soyeon described it as drawing from early 2000s autotune styles, aiming to explore new lyrical themes for the group. Members Yuqi and Minnie also noted the impact of the autotuned sound, with Yuqi likening it to "being hit by electricity" and Minnie recalling it as her introduction to K-pop.

== Promotion ==
I-dle performed "Good Thing" on four music programs in the first week of promotion: Mnet's M Countdown on May 22, KBS's Music Bank on May 23, MBC's Show! Music Core on May 24, and SBS's Inkigayo on May 25.

== Credits and personnel ==
Credits adapted from the EP's liner notes.

Studio

- Cube Studio – recording
- Ingrid Studio – digital editing
- Klang Studio – mixing
- 821 Sound Mastering – mastering

Personnel

- I-dle – vocals
  - Soyeon – lyrics, composition, arrangement
- Kako – background vocals
- Pop Time – composition, arrangement, keyboard
- Daily – composition, arrangement, keyboard
- Likey – composition, arrangement
- Oh Yoo-rim – recording
- Jeong Eun-kyung – digital editing
- Gu Jong-pil – mixing
- Hong Jang-mi – engineered for mix
- Kwon Nam-woo – mastering
- Yoo Eun-jin – mastering (assistant)
- Ryo – guitar

== Charts ==
=== Weekly charts ===
Weekly chart performance for "Good Thing"
Chart (2025)	Peak position
China Korean (TME)	1
South Korea (Circle)	76
Taiwan (Billboard)	5

=== Monthly charts ===
Monthly chart performance for "Good Thing"
Chart (2025)	Peak position
South Korea (Circle)	196

=== Year-end charts ===
Year-end chart performance for "Good Thing"
Chart (2025)	Peak position
China Korean (TME)	7

== Release history ==
Release history for "Good Thing"
Region	Date	Format	Label
Various	May 19, 2025	Digital download; streaming	Cube; Kakao
