= I Am (EP) =

2018 EP by (G)I-dle

- Digital cover

EP by (G)I-dle
- Released: May 2, 2018
- Recorded: 2018
- Genre: Tropical house; hip hop; R&B
- Length: 21:14
- Language: Korean; English
- Label: Cube Entertainment

(G)I-dle chronology
| I Am (2018) | I Made (2019) |

Singles from I Am
- 1. "Latata" Released: May 2, 2018

I Am (stylized in sentence case) is the debut extended play by South Korean girl group (G)I-dle. The album was released digitally on May 2, 2018, and physically on May 3, 2018, by Cube Entertainment. The album contains six tracks including the lead single, "Latata", which was composed by Big Sancho and member Soyeon, and is a blend of several different genres.

== Background and release ==
On April 5, 2018, Cube Entertainment revealed the name of their upcoming girl group, (G)I-dle. The agency revealed the group's lineup by pairs of members: Miyeon and Yuqi, Shuhua and Soojin, Soyeon and Minnie on April 8, April 10 and April 12, respectively. On April 18, Cube Entertainment announced via SNS that the group would debut with the EP I Am on May 2 of the same year. The following day, a debut schedule was released. Concept images featuring each of the members were released from April 23–24.

On April 26, the group unveiled the track listing of the EP, with "Latata" revealed as the lead single. On April 29, an audio snippet video was released, showcasing a short teaser of every song on the album. On April 30, six individual music video teasers for "Latata" were released, as well as a group teaser.

Soyeon described the album I Am as "an album containing six different personalities." She continued, “I wrote the lyrics for the title song "Latata" while thinking about each member."

== Promotion ==
(G)I-dle held a live showcase at the Blue Square iMarket Hall on May 2, where they performed "Latata" along with "Maze".

The group started promoting their title track "Latata" on May 3. They first performed the lead single on Mnet's M Countdown, followed by performances on KBS' Music Bank, MBC's Show! Music Core and SBS's Inkigayo. They received their first-ever music show win since debut on May 22, 2018 on SBS MTV's The Show. Two days later, on May 24, the group received their second music show win for "Latata" on M Countdown.

== Commercial performance ==
I Am debuted and peaked at number thirteen on the Gaon Album Chart issued on April 29, 2018. The album also debuted at number seven and has since peaked at number five on Billboard's World Albums issued on May 9, 2018. The EP has sold 1,000 copies in America as of August 2018.

The album placed at number 13 on Gaon for the month of May 2018, with 15,288 copies sold. The album has sold over 21,916 physical copies as of July 2018.

I Am ranks No. 11 on Billboard's Best K-pop Album of 2018.

In April, 2020, I Am achieved 34,000 album-equivalent units, making it (G)I-dle's biggest-selling album in the United States.

== Track listing ==
| No. | Title | Lyrics | Music | Arrangement | Length |
|---|---|---|---|---|---|
| 1. | "Latata" | Soyeon | Soyeon; Big Sancho | Big Sancho; Soyeon | 3:22 |
| 2. | "$$$" (달라 / Dalla (Dollar)) | Le`mon; Soyeon | Yoon Jong Sung; Le`mon | Yoon Jong Sung | 3:31 |
| 3. | "Maze" | Son Young-jin; Ferdy; Soyeon | Son Young-jin; Ferdy | Son Young-jin; Ferdy | 3:20 |
| 4. | "Don't Text Me" | Big Sancho; Park Hae-il; Jerry Potter; Soyeon | Big Sancho; Park Hae-il; Jerry Potter | Big Sancho; Park Hae-il | 3:36 |
| 5. | "What's in Your House?" (알고 싶어 / Algo Shipeo) | Arin; Vincenzo; Fuxxy; Any Masingga; Soyeon | Arin; Vincenzo; Fuxxy; Any Masingga | Vincenzo; Any Masingga | 3:27 |
| 6. | "Hear Me" (들어줘요 / Deuleojwoyo) | Son Young-jin; Noh Kyung-min | Son Young-jin | | 3:56 |
| Total length: | | | | | 21:14 |

== Charts ==
=== Weekly charts ===
| Chart (2018) | Peak positions |
|---|---|
| South Korean Albums (Gaon) | 6 |
| Taiwanese Albums (Five Music) | 10 |
| US World albums (Billboard) | 5 |

=== Monthly charts ===
| Chart (2018) | Peak position |
|---|---|
| South Korean Albums (Gaon) | 33 |

| Chart (2019) | Peak position |
|---|---|
| South Korean Albums (Gaon) | 82 |

== Certifications and sales ==
| Region | Certification | Certified units/sales |
|---|---|---|
| United States | — | 34,000 |

== Release history ==
| Region | Date | Format | Distributor |
|---|---|---|---|
| Various | May 2, 2018 | Digital download | Cube Entertainment; Kakao M |
| South Korea | May 2, 2018 | Digital download | Cube Entertainment; Kakao M |
| South Korea | May 2, 2018 | CD | Cube Entertainment; Kakao M |
