= I Sway =

- Digital cover

EP by (G)I-dle
- Released: July 8, 2024
- Studio: Cube Studio
- Length: 11:20
- Languages: Korean; English
- Labels: Cube; Kakao

(G)I-dle chronology
2 (2024)	I Sway (2024)	We Are I-dle (2025)

Singles from I Sway
- 1. "Klaxon" Released: July 8, 2024

I Sway is the seventh Korean extended play and tenth overall (Note: When combined with Japanese-language and English-language EPs) by South Korean girl group (G)I-dle. It was released by Cube Entertainment on July 8, 2024, and contains four tracks, including the lead single "Klaxon". It also marks their final release before their rebranding as I-dle in 2025.

== Background and release ==
On June 10, 2024, Cube Entertainment announced that (G)I-dle would be releasing their seventh Korean extended play on July 8. A day later, the promotional schedule was released. On June 21, the concept trailer video was released. Six days later, the track listing was released with "Klaxon" announced as the lead single. On June 28, the audio snippet video was released, followed by the release of five teaser videos titled "Overture" and featuring individual members on July 1. On July 2, the intro film was released. The music video teasers for "Klaxon" was released on July 4 and 5. The extended play was released alongside the music video for "Klaxon" on July 8.

== Promotion ==
Prior to the release of I Sway, on July 8, 2024, (G)I-dle held a live event called "(G)I-dle 7th Mini Album [I Sway] Comeback Live" on YouTube and Weverse, aimed at introducing the extended play and connecting with their fanbase. In support of the EP and its predecessor album 2, the group embarked on their third world tour I-dol, kicking off on August 3, 2024, at the KSPO Dome in Seoul, South Korea.

== Track listing ==
Track listing for I Sway
No.	Title	Lyrics	Music	Arrangement	Length
1.	"Klaxon" (클락션)	Soyeon	Soyeon; Pop Time; Daily; Likey	Pop Time; Daily; Likey; Soyeon	2:55
2.	"Last Forever"	Yuqi; Boytoy; Mojo; Ssuvy; Heggy (Plz)	Yuqi; Boytoy; Mojo; Milli Oshyun; Ssuvy; Heggy (Plz); Jiwoong (Plz)	Boytoy; Mojo; Milli Oshyun; Jiwoong (Plz)	2:26
3.	"Bloom"	Minnie; B.O.	Minnie; BreadBeat; Cashcow	BreadBeat; Cashcow	3:14
4.	"Neverland"	Miyeon; Yuqi	Yuqi; Siixk Jun; Wooseok	Siixk Jun	2:45
Total length:					11:20

== Credits and personnel ==
Credits adapted from the EP's liner notes.

Studio

- Cube Studio – recording (all tracks), digital editing (track 2–4), mixing (track 3–4)
- Ingrid Studio – digital editing (track 1)
- Klang Studio – mixing (track 1–2)
- Red Tune Studio – digital editing (track 2)
- 821 Sound Mastering – mastering (all tracks)

Personnel

- (G)I-dle – vocals
  - Soyeon – lyrics, composition, arrangement (track 1)
  - Yuqi – lyrics, composition (track 2, 4)
  - Minnie – background vocals, lyrics, composition (track 3)
  - Miyeon – lyrics (track 4)
- Kako – background vocals (track 1)
- Sookyoung – background vocals, digital editing (track 2)
- Joo Lee-seo – background vocals (track 4)
- Boytoy – lyrics, composition, arrangement, bass, guitar, drums, keyboard (track 2)
- Mojo – lyrics, composition, arrangement, bass, guitar, drums, keyboard (track 2)
- Ssuvy – lyrics, composition (track 2)
- Heggy (Plz) – lyrics, composition (track 2)
- B.O. – lyrics (track 3)
- Pop Time – composition, arrangement, keyboard (track 1)
- Daily – composition, arrangement, keyboard (track 1)
- Likey – composition, arrangement (track 1)
- Milli Oshyun – composition, arrangement, bass, guitar, drums, keyboard (track 2)
- Jiwoong (Plz) – composition, arrangement (track 2)
- BreadBeat – composition, arrangement, keyboard (track 3)
- Cashcow – composition, arrangement, synthesizer (track 3)
- Siixk Jun – composition, arrangement, keyboard (track 4)
- Wooseok – composition (track 4)
- Kang Roy – recording (track 1, 3), digital editing (track 2–3)
- Oh Yoo-rim – recording (track 2, 4), digital editing (track 4)
- Jeong Eun-kyung – digital editing (track 1)
- Shin Jae-bin – digital editing (track 2–4), mixing (track 3, 4)
- Gu Jong-pil – mixing (track 1–2)
- Hong Jang-mi – engineered for mix (track 1–2)
- Kwon Nam-woo – mastering (all tracks)
- Yoo Eun-jin – mastering (assistant) (all tracks)
- Ryo – guitar (track 1)
- Jiwoong – bass, guitar, drums, keyboard (track 2)
- Young2Beat – guitar (track 3)
- Krap – guitar (track 4)

== Charts ==
=== Weekly charts ===
Weekly chart performance for I Sway
Chart (2024)	Peak position
Hungarian Physical Albums (MAHASZ)	37
Japanese Albums (Oricon)	19
Japanese Combined Albums (Oricon)	25
Japanese Hot Albums (Billboard Japan)	40
Portuguese Albums (AFP)	41
South Korean Albums (Circle)	2
US Top Albums Sales (Billboard)	13
US World Albums (Billboard)	6

=== Monthly charts ===
Monthly chart performance for I Sway
Chart (2024)	Position
South Korean Albums (Circle)	5

=== Year-end charts ===
Year-end chart performance for I Sway
Chart (2024)	Position
South Korean Albums (Circle)	37

== Certifications ==
Certifications for I Sway
Region	Certification	Certified units/sales
South Korea (KMCA)	2× Platinum	500,000^{^}
^{^} Shipments figures based on certification alone.

== Release history ==
Release history for I Sway
Region	Date	Format	Label
South Korea	July 8, 2024	CD	Cube; Kakao
Various	July 8, 2024	Digital download; streaming	Cube; Kakao
