= We Are (EP) =

- Digital cover

EP by I-dle
- Released: May 19, 2025
- Length: 16:44
- Languages: Korean; English
- Labels: Cube; Kakao

I-dle chronology
We Are I-dle (2025)	We Are (2025)	I-dle (2025)

Singles from We Are
- 1. "Good Thing" Released: May 19, 2025

We Are (stylized in sentence case) is the eighth Korean extended play and twelfth overall (Note: When combined with special, Japanese-language and English-language EPs) by South Korean girl group I-dle. It was released by Cube Entertainment on May 19, 2025, and contains six tracks, including the lead single "Good Thing". The release marked the group's first album following their contract renewal with Cube Entertainment and official rebranding from (G)I-dle to I-dle, as well as the first time all members participated in the writing and composition of the songs.

== Background and release ==
On May 2, 2025, the seventh anniversary of (G)I-dle's debut, Cube Entertainment announced that the group would officially be rebranded as I-dle, and that their eighth Korean extended play would be released on May 19. On May 5, upon the release of the individual and group I-dentity trailers, it was confirmed that the extended play would be titled We Are. The tracklist for the extended play was revealed on May 7. On May 8, the music video teaser for the pre-release song "Girlfriend" was released, before the release of the music video on May 9. Two music video teasers for the lead single "Good Thing" were released on May 16. The extended play was released on May 19, alongside the music video for "Good Thing", and marked the group's first album following their contract renewal with Cube Entertainment and rebranding as I-dle.

== Composition ==
We Are marks the first album in which all five I-dle members participated in songwriting and composition, reflecting the members' musical expression throughout the album. "Good Thing", written and composed by Soyeon, features "retro-style instruments and witty 8-bit sounds" with a distinct early 2000s autotune influence, and confident, addictive lyrics. Soyeon also wrote and composed "Girlfriend", a "comforting track offering support to friends experiencing breakups". Yuqi wrote and composed the disco track "Love Tease", while Minnie wrote and composed the "dreamy topline and captivating" track "Chain". The extended play also notably contains Miyeon's first self-composed song to be included on a group album, the medium-tempo R&B pop track "Unstoppable", as well as Shuhua's debut as a songwriter with the ballad track "If You Want".

== Promotion ==
On May 19, 2025, after the release of We Are, I-dle held a live event called "I-dle 8th Mini Album [We Are] Comeback Live" on YouTube to commemorate the release of the extended play and connect with their fanbase.

== Track listing ==
We Are track listing
No.	Title	Lyrics	Music	Arrangement	Length
1.	"Good Thing"	Soyeon	Soyeon; Pop Time; Daily; Likey	Pop Time; Daily; Likey; Soyeon	2:34
2.	"Girlfriend"	Soyeon	Soyeon; Pop Time; Daily; Likey	Pop Time; Daily; Likey; Soyeon	2:42
3.	"Love Tease"	Yuqi; Taneisha Jackson; Chelsea Warner; Charlotte Wilson; Isa Guerra	Yuqi; Siixk Jun; Taneisha Jackson; Chelsea Warner; Charlotte Wilson; Ciara Muscat	Siixk Jun	2:27
4.	"Chain"	Minnie; Tim Tan	Minnie; BreadBeat; Cashcow; B.O.	BreadBeat; Cashcow	3:09
5.	"Unstoppable"	Miyeon	Miyeon; Mingtion; Anne Judith Wik; Dana	Mingtion	2:50
6.	"If You Want" (그래도 돼요)	Shuhua	Yu Song-yeon; Kang Hyun-jin	Yu Song-yeon; Kang Hyun-jin	3:02
Total length:					16:44

== Charts ==
=== Weekly charts ===
Weekly chart performance for We Are
Chart (2025)	Peak position
Japanese Albums (Oricon)	11
Japanese Combined Albums (Oricon)	17
Japanese Hot Albums (Billboard Japan)	50
Scottish Albums (Official Charts)	72
South Korean Albums (Circle)	2
UK Albums Sales (OCC)	86
UK Independent Albums (Official Charts)	27
US Top Albums Sales (Billboard)	35
US World Albums (Billboard)	10

=== Monthly charts ===
Monthly chart performance for We Are
Chart (2025)	Peak position
Japanese Albums (Oricon)	22
South Korean Albums (Circle)	4

=== Year-end charts ===
Year-end chart performance for We Are
Chart (2025)	Position
South Korean Albums (Circle)	20

== Certifications ==
Certifications for We Are
Region	Certification	Certified units/sales
South Korea (KMCA)	3× Platinum	750,000^{^}
^{^} Shipments figures based on certification alone.

== Release history ==
Release history for We Are
Region	Date	Format	Label
Various	May 19, 2025	Digital download; streaming	Cube; Kakao
South Korea	May 19, 2025	CD	Cube; Kakao
United States	May 23, 2025	CD	Cube; BMG
