= Put It Straight =

2019 song by (G)I-dle

Single by (G)I-dle

from the EP I Made and the album Queendom Fan-dora's Box Part 1
- Released: February 26, 2019
- Length: 3:56
- Label: Cube Entertainment
- Songwriter: Soyeon
- Producers: Soyeon; FCM Houdini

(G)I-dle singles chronology
"Uh-Oh" (2019)	"Put It Straight" (2019)	"Lion" (2019)

Audio video
- "Put It Straight" (Nightmare Ver.) on YouTube

"Put It Straight" (Korean: 싫다고 말해), also known as "Tell Me You Don't Like It", is a song recorded by South Korean girl group (G)I-dle, for their second extended play, I Made (2019), which was released on February 26, 2019, by Cube Entertainment. As the third track on the album, it was written by Soyeon, and was produced by Soyeon and FCM Houdini. The original song was described as "a sad ballad song".

"Put It Straight (Nightmare Version)" (싫다고 말해 (Nightmare Version)), is an alternative version of the song for survival show, Queendom. The song was released by Stone Music Entertainment and distributed by Genie Music on October 18, 2019. It is a re-arranged ballad song to a horror version, that expresses the feelings of anger and obsession.

== Background ==
On the 9th episode of Queendom, the group prepared for the second round of 'Pandora's Box'. The theme of the contest was 'Pandora's Box,' and the participants had to perform on stage with the songs they chose. In selecting the songs, Soyeon chose "Put It Straight". Yuqi wanted a more popular song, saying, "It's not just our fans watching." Other members also said, "Because it's a Pandora's box, it would be better to use music the fans wants." but with Soyeon's persuasion, "Because it's a ballad that doesn't have a sense of beat, it would be really cool to arrange it in a dance song," and "I think I should do it while striking a bruise at first, and then giving strength to my eyes." Yuqi commented, "I'm in love. Listening to it, I think it's so good!". The group decided to re-arrange "Put It Straight" with a grotesque feeling.

== Live performances ==
"I think (G)I-dle is a team that challenges prejudice. I want to break the prejudice that shoes are suitable for dresses, and to show that we can dance barefoot in dresses too."

— Soyeon, leader of (G)I-dle.

The group performed the song on episode 9 of Queendom Fan-dora's Box. The musical performance started off with the sound of the rain, with dreamy but bizarre and horror atmosphere, and the glitch sound effect that gives the audience a dramatic atmosphere feeling. The group attracted the viewer's attention on the contrast of red dresses danced with bare feet, and smudged red lipstick with their hands to give a bleeding effect.

After the stage, they received praises form viewers and contestants. Jimin from AOA was surprised by saying, "It feels like watching a music video," and Lovelyz clapped and admired, "You're so good." Oh My Girl's YooA said, "It was a stage to imprint." The performance was called "another legend stage was born, with the perfect performance expressing anger in sadness and the detailed emotional acting of the members". A video of the performance was released through Mnet's official YouTube account the same day. It surpassed one million views after 14 hours of release. The group placed fourth in the round. It was later revealed that (G)I-dle partnered up with Touch in Sol for their LaLa Bla's lipstick.

On October 29, 2019, (G)I-dle released a choreographed video of "Put It Straight" (Halloween version) as a gift for their fans.

== Credits and personnel ==
=== Nightmare version ===
Credits are adapted from Melon.

- (G)I-dle – vocals
  - Soyeon – producing, songwriting, rap arrangement, audio engineer, chorus
- June – audio engineer, synthesizer
- FCM Houdini – guitar
- Shin Jae-bin (Cube Studio) – recording, mixing
- Jeon Jeon (Cube Studio) – recording
- Kwon Nam-woo (821 Sound mastering) – mastering engineer

== Track listing ==
- I Made
3. "Put It Straight" (싫다고 말해) – 3:56
- Queendom Fan-dora's Box Part 1
1. "Put It Straight (Nightmare Version)" (싫다고 말해 (Nightmare Version) – 4:16

== Charts ==
Chart performance for "Put It Straight (Nightmare Version)"
Chart (2020)	Peak position
South Korea (Gaon)	199
South Korea (K-pop Hot 100)	100

== Release history ==
Region	Date	Format	Version	Distributor
Various	February 26, 2019	Digital download; streaming	Original	Cube; Kakao M
Various	October 18, 2019	Digital download; streaming	Nightmare	Stone; Genie Music
