= Klaxon (song) =

Single by (G)I-dle

from the EP I Sway
- Language: Korean; English
- Released: July 8, 2024
- Genre: Dance
- Length: 2:55
- Label: Cube; Kakao
- Composers: Soyeon; Pop Time; Daily; Likey
- Lyricist: Soyeon

(G)I-dle singles chronology
"Super Lady" (2024)	"Klaxon" (2024)	"Good Thing" (2025)

Music video
- "Klaxon" on YouTube

"Klaxon" (Korean: 클락션; RR: Keullaksyeon) is a song recorded by South Korean girl group (G)I-dle for their seventh Korean extended play I Sway. It was released as the EP's lead single by Cube Entertainment on July 8, 2024.

== Background and release ==
On June 10, 2024, Cube Entertainment announced that (G)I-dle would be releasing their seventh Korean extended play on July 8. On June 27, the track listing was released with "Klaxon" announced as the lead single. A day later, the audio snippet video was released. The music video teasers were released on July 4 and 5. The song was released alongside its music video and the extended play on July 8.

== Composition ==
"Klaxon" was written, composed, and arranged by Soyeon, with Pop Time, Daily, and Likey participating in the composition. It was described as a "summer" dance song featuring "string, brass, and guitar rhythm" with lyrics about "expressing the feelings of a person in love". "Klaxon" was composed in the key of B minor, with a tempo of 120 beats per minute.

== Promotion ==
Prior to the release of I Sway, on July 8, 2024, (G)I-dle held a live event called "(G)I-dle 7th Mini Album [I Sway] Comeback Live" on YouTube and Weverse, aimed at introducing the extended play and its songs, including "Klaxon", and connecting with their fanbase. They subsequently performed the song on three music programs: Mnet's M Countdown on July 11, KBS's Music Bank on July 12, and MBC's Show! Music Core on July 13.

== Reception ==
Reporter Kim Ji-hye emphasized that the summery vibe of "Klaxon," with its smooth string melodies, brass, and rhythmic guitar, makes it the perfect track for office workers in the early morning, "providing a refreshing break from the summer heat." The song's catchy chorus, combined with the viral 'Jjanggu Dance,' also helped propel its popularity on short-form video platforms. Cultural critic Ha Jae-geun praised the group's image transformation, noting how the cheerful and seasonally fitting song appealed to diverse audiences. He also commended the group's dedication to innovation over their seven-year career, with members actively participating in album production.

=== Accolades ===
Music program awards for "Klaxon"
Program	Date	Ref.
Inkigayo	August 11, 2024	
Inkigayo	August 18, 2024	
Inkigayo	August 25, 2024	

Melon Weekly Popularity Award
Award	Date	Ref.
Weekly Popularity Award	August 12, 2024	

== Credits and personnel ==
Credits adapted from the EP's liner notes.

Studio

- Cube Studio – recording
- Ingrid Studio – digital editing
- Klang Studio – mixing
- 821 Sound Mastering – mastering

Personnel

- (G)I-dle – vocals
  - Soyeon – lyrics, composition, arrangement
- Kako – background vocals
- Pop Time – composition, arrangement, keyboard
- Daily – composition, arrangement, keyboard
- Likey – composition, arrangement
- Kang Roy – recording
- Jeong Eun-kyung – digital editing
- Gu Jong-pil – mixing
- Hong Jang-mi – engineered for mix
- Kwon Nam-woo – mastering
- Yoo Eun-jin – mastering (assistant)
- Ryo – guitar

== Charts ==
=== Weekly charts ===
Weekly chart performance for "Klaxon"
Chart (2024)	Peak position
China Korean (TME)	1
Global Excl. US (Billboard)	95
Hong Kong (Billboard)	19
South Korea (Circle)	3
Taiwan (Billboard)	3

=== Monthly charts ===
Monthly chart performance for "Klaxon"
Chart (2024)	Position
South Korea (Circle)	3

=== Year-end charts ===
Year-end chart performance for "Klaxon"
Chart	Year	Position
South Korea (Circle)	2024	58
China Korean (TME)	2024	9
South Korea (Circle)	2025	128

== Release history ==
Release history for "Klaxon"
Region	Date	Format	Label
Various	July 8, 2024	Digital download; streaming	Cube; Kakao
