= I Feel =

- Digital cover

EP by (G)I-dle
- Released: May 15, 2023
- Studios: Cube Studio (Seoul); Ingrid Studio (Seoul)
- Genre: Pop
- Length: 17:03
- Languages: Korean; English
- Labels: Cube; Kakao
- Producer: Soyeon

(G)I-dle chronology
I Love (2022)	I Feel (2023)	Heat (2023)

Physical edition covers
- Butterfly, Queen and Cat versions, left to right

Singles from I Feel
- 1. "Queencard" Released: May 15, 2023

I Feel (stylized in sentence case) is the sixth Korean extended play (eighth overall) by South Korean girl group (G)I-dle. It was released by Cube Entertainment digitally on May 15, 2023, and physically the following day. It consists of three physical versions: Cat, Butterfly, and Queen. The EP contains six tracks, including the pre-released video track "Allergy" (Note: Released May 9, 2023, exclusively on YouTube. Later on, the song was officially released on streaming platforms in conjunction with the album release.) and the lead single "Queencard". The group retains their reputation as a "self-produce" group by having three members Soyeon, Minnie, and Yuqi taking the lead in the album production.

The album conveys a message about self-esteem and confidence by discussing topics about finding self-confidence, loving, enjoying, and figuring out oneself as an adult, using a more light and comical style that has a less serious tone compared to the group's previous releases. Sonically, it experiments with a variety of genres such as pop rock, electro pop, pop ballad, and dream pop, with its songs incorporating newtro, rock, and minimalistic production. The album took the form of a High Teen, and a Y2K-inspired visual. It also marks the group's condition of "I" series, following I Love and I Never Die (2022).

I Feel received generally favorable reviews from music critics, who praised its catchy production, visuals, the less serious approach to its topics, and the members creative control over the production. Commercially, it debuted at number one on the Circle Chart, with over one million copies sold in its first week. The album also managed to reach the top forty in Belgium, Germany, Hungary, Japan, Scotland, Sweden, the United States, and the United Kingdom.

The album was supported by a pre-release music video for its second track, "Allergy", which peaked at number seven on Billboard Taiwan and at number 18 on the Circle Digital Chart. This was followed by the lead single "Queencard", which scored the group's third number one hit on said Chart. To promote the album, the group embarked on their second worldwide tour, I Am Free-ty World Tour, beginning in June 2023.

== Background and release ==
On April 18, 2023, Cube Entertainment announced the group's comeback on May 15 by releasing a video teaser with style resembling that of a trailer of a series. The video revealed the titles of the new songs as well as the credits. The announcement was also accompanied by a concept poster featuring a drawing of a Trump's queen card, with the letter 'G', representing the G in the group's name, engraved in the upper left corner of the poster instead of 'Q', in which means queen. In addition, phrases such as 'Top 10' at the top right and '(G)I-dle Original Series' at the bottom.

On April 24, the group released a teaser video which included the tracklist, revealing "Queencard" as the lead single. The following day, the group released five "casting board" teaser images. From April 26 to May 4, the group released a series of teasers and photos that narratives a story, which took the form of "High Teen", Mean Girls, and Y2K‐inspired visuals throughout the releases.

Beginning on April 26, the group released a character introduction video, inspired by the 2004 movie Mean Girls. On the same day, they released a "character map", an introduction to each character that was played by the members. On the following day April 27, the group released a video with the title "Spoiler Alert: [I feel] #Yuqi" that showcased snippets of the fourth track, "All Night". On April 28, the group released Shuhua's version of the spoiler video, which showcased snippets of the sixth track, "Peter Pan". The released video displays a storyline that is connected to the previous spoiler video.

On 29th, the group released five sets of the Queen concept images, consisting of three images for each member. On May 1, Minnie's version of the "Spoiler Alert" video was released, and it showcased snippets of the third track, "Lucid". The video shows references to the group previous release "Tomboy". On May 2, Miyeon's spoiler video was released with snippets of the fifth track, "Paradise". On May 3, the group released six Butterfly concept images. On May 4, Soyeon's spoiler video was released with snippets of the second track, "Allergy". On May 5, seven of the Cat concept images was released.

On May 9, 2023, Cube uploaded five individual teaser photos for each member of the group on their social media accounts, confirming the release of track two "Allergy", on May 10. On May 11, an "interview video" teaser was released. The video took the form of behind-the-scenes commentary video with a snippets of the group being interviewed about the album.

== Conception and title ==
I Feel is an album containing (G)I-dle's declaration that they will love themselves as they are, no matter how they feel and that they want to boost the listeners self-esteem.

Soyeon noted in the album press release that she was inspired by the 2018 American movie I Feel Pretty when composing the lead single "Queencard", she stated that she wanted to make the album and its lead single sound like a comedy movie "that describes the daily lives of those in their 20s and their concerns". Thus the group took on "a new challenge" to dramatize the album through tracks "that develop around one single story in which each member has their own character", in which Soyeon plays the character of an "aspiring queen bee", while Miyeon is a social media influencer, Minnie is a lonely gym trainer, and Yuqi and Shuhua are popular besties. The narrative begins with the music video of the pre-release video "Allergy", and the story continues in the music video of the lead single "Queencard", where Soyeon realizes that "true beauty comes from self-confidence after finding out that even the queen bees have their own insecurities and compare themselves with others." Visually, Soyeon draws inspiration from "high-teen" and Y2K throughout the music videos, artwork, and album teasers.

== Music and lyrics ==
The album is primarily a pop record and consists of six tracks that incorporate a variety of genres, such as pop rock, electro pop, pop ballad, and dream pop, with its songs incorporating newtro, rock, R&B, and minimalistic production. All tracks were produced by Soyeon, while Minnie and Yuqi served as co-composer and lyricist for "Lucid," "Paradise," "All Night," and "Peter Pan" respectively. In addition to the members, a variety of songwriter-producers also participated, including longtime collaborators such as Pop Time, BreadBeat, and Siixk Jun, with whom the group has worked on previous songs.

=== Theme ===
"If we had done music that taught and gave lessons before, this time we wanted to express the songs [message] with a light and comical point along with the motif of the movie I Feel Pretty.

— Soyeon explaining the art direction of the album, Electronic Times.

According to Soyeon, the subject matter of I Feel revolves around conveying a message about self-esteem and confidence, of which the latter two are recurring themes in the group's previous work . In comparison to the group's previous releases, which took more of a serious tone, the group wanted this time to express the intended message in "a light and comical way, along with the motif of the movie I Feel Pretty." The album overall discusses the message of self-esteem, which "changes according to one's thoughts and emotions". According to Soyeon, the album narrates a story that "expresses the daily life and worries of people in their 20s".

=== Songs ===
The opening track, "Queencard" is characterized by a "newtro vibe" where its lyrics talk about a person who "realizes that true beauty comes from self-confidence after finding out that even the queen bees have their own insecurities and compare themselves with others". The second track, "Allergy", is a pop-punk song with lyrics that expresses the double meaning of wanting to love themselves while they resent themself by comparing themselves to others. The third track, "Lucid" is a dreamy song characterized by a "unique" bass-organ harmony. Followed by "All Night", a pop song that is driven by a "low-slung", elastic bassline with heavy elements of rock riffs. Its lyrics revolve around a protagonist who wants to enjoy herself as she attempts to ignore other people's glares and enjoy the night. The fifth track, "Paradise", is an emotional electro-pop, synth and pop ballad song built around a "catchy" acoustic guitar riff and a groovy swing beat. Its lyrics revolve around comforting someone who is tired of everyday life and struggles "to become an adult defined by society". Followed by the closing track, "Peter Pan", is a minimalistic song built around a "bright" instrumental including acoustic guitar, strums and snapping beats. Its lyrics were described as "witty" lyrics that express the confusion of 20-year-olds who are in the process of figuring out their adult lives.

== Critical reception ==
Professional ratings
Review scores
Source	Rating
NME	4/5 stars
All Music	4/5 stars

NME's Rhian Daly, highlighted its mix of campy fun and deeper themes. He noted that some tracks like "Queencard" offer enjoyable moments, others fall flat. Despite this, he praised how the album showcases the group's willingness to experiment creatively. All Music's Neil Z. Yeung complemented the album's "genre-blurring pop" songs that incorporate a variety of other genres writing, "[on] I Feel, (G)I-dle amps up the fun and energy with six genre-blurring pop anthems that incorporate dance beats, rock riffs, and R&B slickness." Ilgan Sports's Journalist Kwon Hye-mi praised (G)I-dle's shift in visual style, noting that unlike their previous concept in "Nxde," which was more extreme, the concept photos for I Feel showcased a freer and more natural appearance. She further highlighted the increased involvement of the group members in the production process, which contributed to the matured musical direction of (G)I-dle, showcasing their collective effort and musical growth. On a more negative note, South Korean music critic Mimyo criticized in his review for Yes24 the lead single "Queencard," while he complimented the rest of the album's tracks. I Feel was named one of the top K-Pop albums of 2023 by Billboard. It was highlighted how the group was heavily involved in the album's creation, with members Soyeon, Minnie, and Yuqi leading in songwriting, composing, and production. They also highlighted the album "relatable" themes like social media anxieties and self-confidence, showcasing the group's growth alongside their fans.

== Commercial performance ==
In South Korea the EP surpassed one million copies in pre-orders on May 14, due to this, Cube Entertainment is predicted to exceed their total consolidated sales for the first half of 2023. On its first week, the album debuted at number one on the Circle Chart with over one million copies, achieving one of the highest Initial Chodong sales on said chart. In United States, the album debuted at number one on World Albums Charts, at number seven on Top Album Sales and at number 41 on the Billboard 200 with 18,000 equivalent album units, including 16,000 in album sales.

According to the International Federation of the Phonographic Industry (IFPI)'s Global Music Report for 2023, I Feel was the fourteenth best-selling album worldwide, having sold 2 million units. (Note: The IFPI Global Albums chart ranks, in order, the albums that generated the most money globally across streaming, download, and physical record sales (combined) in a calendar year. The Global Album Sales Chart measures global unit sales across all physical formats, as well as full album downloads.)

== Artwork and packaging ==
The physical album was released in three versions with three concepts: Queen, Butterfly, and Cat. In the Queen version, (G)I-dle showed "haughty eyes and elegant expressions", with the members staring at the camera. In the said version, the five members are shown dressed in pink outfits and shining tiaras. In the Butterfly version, the group embraced a "dreamy atmosphere", in which each member wore a butterfly wings over a white dress. In the Cat version, (G)I-dle exuded a chic expression and a mysterious atmosphere, with the group showing off their "strong chemistry" by lying on the bed while "enjoying" their leisure time. The EP comes with a CD, lyric paper, booklet, photocard, polaroid, a mini poster, and a tattoo sticker, ID card, and poster which are only available for pre-order. The Target exclusive versions will contain an additional mini photobook and photocard. The album also came in jewel cases as well, and there will be five versions covering all five members of the group.

== Promotion ==
To communicate the release of the album, the group released two episodes of their series "We Spotlight", exclusively on Melon, released through 'Melon Spotlight' on May 15 and 16, respectively. The series is for discussing and introducing the album and the story behind each song. On the same day the group also held a live event at Chosun Palace Gangnam, Gangnam-gu called "production presentation" to introduce the album and its songs, including "Queencard".

== Accolades ==
Awards and nominations
Organization	Year	Category	Result	Ref.
Asian Pop Music Awards	2023	Best Album of the Year	Won	
Asian Pop Music Awards	2023	Top 20 Albums of the Year (Overseas)	Won	
China Year End Awards	2023	Best Selling Female K-pop Album	Won	
China Year End Awards	2023	Best Selling Female Group Album	Won	
MAMA Awards	2023	Album of the Year	Nominated	
Melon Music Awards	2023	Album of the Year	Nominated	
Golden Disc Awards	2024	Album Bonsang	Nominated	

== Track listing ==
Track listing for I Feel
No.	Title	Lyrics	Music	Arrangement	Length
1.	"Queencard" (퀸카)	Soyeon	Soyeon; PopTime; Daily; Likey	PopTime; Daily; Likey; Soyeon	2:41
2.	"Allergy"	Soyeon	Soyeon; PopTime; Daily; Likey; Kako	PopTime; Daily; Likey; Soyeon	2:42
3.	"Lucid"	Minnie; Soyeon	Minnie; BreadBeat; Sinkung	BreadBeat; Sinkung	2:55
4.	"All Night"	Yuqi; Wooseok	Yuqi; Siixk Jun	Siixk Jun	2:26
5.	"Paradise"	Minnie; B.O; Soyeon	Minnie; BreadBeat	BreadBeat	3:09
6.	"Peter Pan" (어린 어른)	Soyeon; Yuqi	Yuqi; Siixk Jun; Wooseok	Siixk Jun	3:10
Total length:					17:03

== Credits and personnel ==
Credits adopted from album liner notes.

Musicians

- (G)I-dle – vocals
  - Soyeon – background vocals (tracks 1, 2)
  - Minnie – background vocals (tracks 3, 5)
  - Yuqi – background vocals (tracks 4, 6)
- Kako – background vocals (tracks 1, 2)
- J.mee Kim (김제이미) – background vocals (track 4)
- Wooseok (우석) – background vocals (tracks 4, 6)
- Ryo – guitar (tracks 1, 2), bass (tracks 1, 2)
- Krap (박종훈) – guitar (tracks 4, 6)
- Jung Kyu-tae (정규태) – bass (track 4)
- Pop Time – keyboard (tracks 1, 2)
- Daily – keyboard (tracks 1, 2)
- BreadBeat – piano (tracks 3, 5), synthesizer (track 5)
- Siixk Jun – bass (track 6), piano (tracks 4, 6)
- Shin Kung (신쿵) – synthesizer (track 3)

Technical

- Soyeon – producer
- Choi Ye-ji (최예지) – recording (tracks 1, 2, 3, 4)
- Yang Young-eun (양영은) – recording (track 2)
- Jung Eun-kyung (정은경) – digital editing (tracks 1, 2)
- Kang Sun-young (강선영) – engineering (tracks 1, 2)
- Gu Jong-pil (구종필) – mixing (tracks 1, 2)
- Shin Jae-bin (신재빈) – recording (tracks 5, 6), mixing (tracks 3, 5, 6)
- Stay Tuned – mixing (track 4)
- Kwon Nam-woo (권남우) – mastering
- Yoo Eun-jin (유은진) – assistant mastering

Studios

- Cube Studio – recording, mixing (tracks 3, 5)
- Ingrid Studio – recording (track 2), digital editing (tracks 1, 2)
- Nmore – digital editing (track 2)
- Klang Studio – mixing (tracks 1, 2)
- Stay Tuned Studio – (tracks 4)
- 821 Sound Mastering – mastering

== Charts ==
=== Weekly charts ===
Weekly chart performance for I Feel
Chart (2023)	Peak position
Austrian Albums (Ö3 Austria)	58
Belgian Albums (Ultratop Flanders)	36
Belgian Albums (Ultratop Wallonia)	90
Croatian International Albums (HDU)	6
French Albums (SNEP)	105
German Albums (Offizielle Top 100)	25
Hungarian Albums (MAHASZ)	8
Japanese Albums (Oricon)	19
Japanese Combined Albums (Oricon)	20
Japanese Hot Albums (Billboard Japan)	34
Scottish Albums (Official Charts)	12
South Korean Albums (Circle)	1
Swedish Physical Albums (Sverigetopplistan)	17
UK Album Downloads (Official Charts)	69
UK Albums Sales (OCC)	12
UK Independent Albums (Official Charts)	2
UK Physical Albums (OCC)	12
US Billboard 200	41
US Independent Albums (Billboard)	9
US World Albums (Billboard)	1

=== Monthly charts ===
Monthly chart performance for I Feel
Chart (2023)	Position
Japanese Albums (Oricon)	40
South Korean Albums (Circle)	5

=== Year-end charts ===
Year-end chart performance for I Feel
Chart (2023)	Position
South Korean Albums (Circle)	29

== Certifications and sales ==
Sales certifications for I Feel
Region	Certification	Certified units/sales
South Korea (KMCA)	Million	1,011,954
South Korea (KMCA) POCA version	Platinum	250,000^{^}
United States	—	18,000
Japan	—	2,727
Summaries
Worldwide	—	2,000,000
^{^} Shipments figures based on certification alone.

== Release history ==
Release formats for I Feel
Region	Date	Format	Version	Label	Ref.
Various	May 15, 2023	Digital download; streaming	Digital	Cube; Kakao	
Various	May 16, 2023	CD	Standard; jewel	Cube; Kakao	
United States	May 19, 2023	CD	Exclusive	Cube	
United States	August 14, 2023	CD	Standard	Genie Music	
