= Allergy (song) =

2023 song by (G)I-dle

- Promotional graphic

Song by (G)I-dle

from the EP I Feel
- Language: Korean; English
- Released: May 15, 2023
- Studio: Cube Studio; Ingrid Studio
- Genre: Pop punk
- Length: 2:42
- Label: Cube; Kakao
- Songwriters: Soyeon; PopTime; Daily; Likey
- Producer: Soyeon

Music video
- "Allergy" on YouTube

"Allergy" is a song recorded by South Korean girl group (G)I-dle. It is the second track on the group's sixth extended play, I Feel (2023), which was released on May 15, 2023, through Cube Entertainment. The track was written, composed, and arranged by Soyeon with additional composition and arrangement handled by PopTime, Daily, and Likey. The song expresses the double meaning of wanting to love themselves while they resent themself by comparing themselves to others.

== Music and lyrics ==
"Allergy" was written, composed, and arranged by Soyeon, with additional credits from Pop Time, Daily, and Likey. The song was originally intended to be a story about love, but due to Soyeon wanting to talk about "self-esteem and confidence" as well as the members who are "full" of the latter two, she got inspired by them and changed the theme of the song. Musically, it is a pop-punk song with lyrics that expresses the double meaning of wanting to love themselves while they resent themself by comparing themselves to others. It includes two lyrical references: Shuhua's verses "I also want to dance 'Hype Boy'" play on the lyric from NewJeans's song "Hype Boy," and the second reference is in the verses "But on the screen, I'd look like [a] tomboy," referencing the group's 2022 hit single "Tomboy."

== Critical reception ==
Lee Ye-ju of Kyunghyang Shinmun describes the song as "honest" as it "emphasized the relative deprivation the speaker felt through social media." Leisure Byte reviewer Hrishita Das, wrote about the song, "speak volumes about how women's empowerment is portrayed in the media during present times. Women are expected to look pretty, wear the trendiest clothes and display confidence every step of the way. Moreover, having a 'perfect' body is a must to look and feel like a 'Queen'. The ones who do not go the extra mile to 'serve' looks are humiliated and treated like an outcast."

== Music video ==
On May 10, 2023, Cube released the music video of the song, through (G)I-dle's official YouTube channel. The video recorded 5 million views in less than 24 hours after being released on YouTube.

=== Synopsis ===
The video was filmed in the United States and was inspired by the 2018 American movie I Feel Pretty. The video was described as a critique of social media culture and how it can influence people's lives. it showcases two sides: a woman who is "perfect" but feels that her life is "empty and hollow," and another who is craves to look like the first woman. However, when the 'perfect' one tries to forget her problems by spending money and socializing with the elite class, she is still held down by her own insecurities created inside her mind.

The video took the form of a "high-teen" movie, starting with Soyeon, who is playing the role of an insecure protagonist while Miyeon, Minnie, Yuqi, and Shuhua are playing the roles of the "popular girls in school" who set out to give Soyeon a makeover. The video begins with Soyeon feeling trapped in "an appearance complex" – looking in the mirror and making a "dissatisfied expression" towards her own appearance. The video then cuts to show snippets of the daily lives of the popular girls, who spend a "splendid day" in compressing to Soyeon, who admires the latters and wishes to be them. On other hand, the video shows a few members trying to cope with the negative and "mean" comments on social media that ultimately affects their mental health. Towards the end of the video, Soyeon was ready to go under the knife in order to change her looks and fit in with her friends.

=== Reception ===
Kang Kyung-yoon writing for SBS Entertainment News regarded the video as "a story with a clear theme was completed with a 3–4 minute song, and the scene spreading around the world through a complete music video is very meaningful. In this process, the language barrier is not felt at all." Leisure Byte's Hrishita Das noted the vibrant costumes and make-up used in the video that adds the "elegance" of the music video written, "the colour pink is thoroughly used to display a more feminine perspective and visual the cliched appeal" Hrishita went to praise the group's music video, camera work in vivid locations that makes the music video stand out more.

== Credits and personnel ==
Credits adopted from album liner notes.

Studios

- Cube Studio – recording
- Ingrid Studio – recording, digital editing
- Nmore – digital editing
- Klang Studio – mixing
- 821 Sound Mastering – mastering

Song credits

- (G)I-dle – vocals
  - Soyeon – background vocals, producer, lyrics, composition, arrangement
- Kako – background vocals
- Pop Time – composition, arrangement, keyboard
- Daily – composition, arrangement, keyboard
- Likey – composition, arrangement
- Ryo – guitar, bass
- Choi Ye-ji (최예지) – recording
- Yang Young-eun (양영은) – recording
- Jung Eun-kyung (정은경) – digital editing
- Kang Sun-young (강선영) – engineer
- Gu Jong-pil (구종필)
- Kwon Nam-woo (권남우) – mastering
- Yoo Eun-jin (유은진) – assistant mastering

== Charts ==
=== Weekly charts ===
Weekly chart performance for "Allergy"
Chart (2023)	Peak position
South Korea (Circle)	18
Taiwan (Billboard)	7

=== Monthly charts ===
Monthly chart performance for "Allergy"
Chart (2023)	Position
South Korea (Circle)	19

=== Year-end charts ===
Year-end chart performance for "Allergy"
Chart (2023)	Position
South Korea (Circle)	106
