= Yuq1 =

- Digital cover

EP by Yuqi
- Released: April 23, 2024
- Genres: Dance; hip-hop; R&B
- Length: 19:19
- Languages: English; Korean
- Labels: Cube; Kakao

Yuqi chronology
Grey Track (2023)	Yuq1 (2024)	Motivation (2025)

Singles from Yuq1
- 1. "Could It Be" Released: April 5, 2024; 2. "Freak" Released: April 23, 2024

Yuq1 is the first extended play (EP) by Chinese singer-songwriter Yuqi. The EP was released on April 23, 2024, and was promoted with its two singles, "Could It Be" and "Freak".

== Background ==
Following the release of her digital single album A Page in 2021, Yuqi announced her new album Yuq1 on April 2, 2024. Although Yuqi had previously pursued solo music, Yuq1 was declared to be the official beginning of her solo career, making her the third member of South Korean girl group I-dle to debut as a soloist. After her participation in composition and lyrics for I-dle's songs, the EP also marked Yuqi's first time composing her own album.

== Promotion and release ==
Revealing a preview for Yuq1, Cube Entertainment posted a concept trailer on YouTube, showing Yuqi playing a guitar while reminiscing about her past before investigating the sudden whispers and screams around her. To promote the EP, "Could It Be" was rolled out as a pre-release single on April 5, 2024. Yuq1 was released on April 23, 2024. Its lead single "Freak" was released alongside an accompanying music video on the same day.

The following month, Shinsegae Centum City, in collaboration with IPX (formerly Line Friends), opened a pop-up store that featured a themed photo zone, as well as a variety of clothes and merchandise, to commemorate the release of the mini-album.

=== Title and artwork ===
The EP's title, which is based on her name, aimed to capture the essence of who Yuqi is as a solo artist; the inclusion of the number 1 to replace the letter I visually expressed her confidence in both the album and her future career. Design-wise, a red rabbit was featured on the EP's concept photos, cover art, and tracklist as a "main character", which Yuqi stated to represent herself, explaining: "I was born in the year of the Rabbit, and my favorite color is red!"

== Commercial performance ==
Yuq1 accumulated more than 500,000 units in pre-order sales. The mini-album then sold a total of 550,170 copies during the first week of its release, breaking the record of the highest first-week sales made by a K-pop female solo artist's debut EP. In South Korea, it debuted at number two on the Circle Album Chart for the week of April 21 to 27, 2024.

== Track listing ==
Yuq1 track listing
No.	Title	Lyrics	Music	Arrangement	Length
1.	"Freak"	Jop Pangemanan; Kyle Faulkner; Audun Agnar Gludbrandsen; Yuqi	Pangemanan; Faulkner; Gludbrandsen; Yuqi; Siixk Jun	Siixk Jun; Krap	2:51
2.	"My Way"	Yuqi; Boytoy; Mojo; Sohi	Yuqi; Boytoy; Mojo; Jiwoong; Sohi	Boytoy; Mojo; Jiwoong	2:48
3.	"Drink It Up" (featuring pH-1)	Yuqi; Boytoy; Mojo; Muna; XU; Jenna; pH-1	Yuqi; Boytoy; Mojo; Milli Oshyun; Muna; XU; Jenna; Disko; pH-1	Boytoy; Mojo; Oshyun	3:16
4.	"Red Rover"	Elsa Curran; Stela Cole; Joshua Murty; Mark Schick	Curran; Cole; Murty; Schick	Murty; Schick	2:03
5.	"On Clap" (featuring Lexie Liu)	Oscar Scheller; Jesse Thomas; Naomi Wild; Yuqi; Lexie Liu	Scheller; Thomas; Wild; Siixk Jun; Liu	Siixk Jun	1:58
6.	"Everytime" (featuring Minnie)	Yuqi; Boytoy; S’oom; Zun; Muna	Yuqi; Boytoy; S'oom; Zun; Muna; Disko; Warming; Junsoo	Boytoy; Disko	3:11
7.	"Could It Be"	Mike Elizondo; Mikky Ekko	Elizondo; Micky Ekko	Elizondo; Micky Ekko	3:09
Total length:					19:19

== Charts ==
=== Weekly charts ===
Weekly chart performance for Yuq1
Chart (2024)	Peak position
Belgian Albums (Ultratop Wallonia)	145
Japanese Albums (Oricon)	42
Portuguese Albums (AFP)	108
South Korean Albums (Circle)	2

=== Monthly charts ===
Monthly chart performance for Yuq1
Chart (2024)	Position
South Korean Albums (Circle)	7

=== Year-end charts ===
Year-end chart performance for Yuq1
Chart (2024)	Position
South Korean Albums (Circle)	35

== Certifications ==
Certifications for Yuq1
Region	Certification	Certified units/sales
South Korea (KMCA)	2× Platinum	500,000^{^}
^{^} Shipments figures based on certification alone.
