= Motivation (single album) =

- Digital cover

Single album by Yuqi
- Released: September 16, 2025
- Length: 9:30
- Languages: English, Korean, Chinese
- Labels: Cube; Kakao
- Producer: Yuqi

Yuqi chronology
Yuq1 (2024)	Motivation (2025)	27 (2026)

Singles from Motivation
- 1. "M.O." Released: September 16, 2025

Motivation is the third single album by Chinese singer-songwriter Yuqi. The album was released on September 16, 2025, by Cube Entertainment. Motivation consists three songs, the lead single and title track, "M.O." and the Korean and Chinese versions of the song "Gone". It is also her first single album to feature Korean lyrics.

== Promotion and release ==
On September 1, 2025, Cube Entertainment announced that Yuqi would be releasing her third single album Motivation on September 16, with the lead single "M.O.". On September 9, Cube released the music video for the pre-release single "Gone (Korean ver.)" via I-dle's official YouTube channel. The album's release was preceded by the release of a music video for the track "Gone" (아프다) on September 10, which starred Chinese actor Wang Anyu. On September 11, Cube released the first teaser for the music video of the title track, "M.O.", and on September 15, they released the second teaser for the music video of the aforementioned title track, both via I-dle's official YouTube channel. The following day, they released the music video for the title track, "M.O.," also via I-dle's official YouTube channel, and simultaneously released the album.

== Track listing ==
Motivation track listing
No.	Title	Lyrics	Music	Arrangement	Length
1.	"M.O."	Song Yuqi; Charlotte Wilson	Song Yuqi; Siixk Jun; Charlotte Wilson; Taneisha Jackson	Siixk Jun	3:02
2.	"Gone (Note: Korean: "아프다")" (Korean ver.)	Song Yuqi; Jung Woo-seok	Yuqi Olczyk	Siixk Jun	3:14
3.	"Gone (Note: Chinese: "還痛嗎")" (Chinese ver.)	Song Yuqi; Jung Woo-seok; Lilas; Elecen Zhan; JustinW; Li Xiang; Juny	Siixk Jun	Siixk Jun	3:14
Total length:					9:30

== Charts ==
Weekly chart performance for Motivation
Chart (2025)	Peak position
South Korean Albums (Circle)	2

== Certifications ==
Certifications for Motivation
Region	Certification	Certified units/sales
South Korea (KMCA)	Platinum	250,000^{^}
^{^} Shipments figures based on certification alone.

== Release history ==
Release history for Motivation
Region	Date	Format	Label
Various	September 16, 2025	Digital download; streaming	Cube; Kakao
