= Dark (X-File) =

2022 song by (G)I-dle

Song by (G)I-dle

from the EP I Love
- Language: Korean
- Released: October 17, 2022
- Genre: Alt-rock
- Length: 2:45
- Label: Cube
- Lyricist: Soyeon
- Producers: Yuqi; Siixk Jun

Audio video
- "X-File" on YouTube

"Dark (X-File)" (stylized as DARK (X-file)) is a song recorded by South Korean girl group (G)I-dle for their fifth extended play I Love as the sixth track. The song was released on October 17, 2022, by Cube Entertainment. It was written by leader Soyeon and produced by member Yuqi and Siixk Jun. The song is about the essential feelings from being in love.

== Background and composition ==
On September 14, 2022, Cube Entertainment announced (G)I-dle would be releasing their fifth extended play I Love on October 17. On October 10, Cube released an audio snippet of each song from the album except "Dark (X-File)". Alongside the announcement, (G)I-dle's surprise-released the track video on October 12, 2022, five days before their full EP. The inspiration for the song came to Yuqi while drinking Tsingtao beer in her studio with lights turned off. It is composed in the key of A minor, with a tempo of 166 bpm and a running time of 2 minutes and 45 seconds. (Note: Some sources have misidentified A major as the key signature. The correct scale is A harmonic minor because the song uses the following keys: A, B, C, D, E, F, and G♯.)

== Critical reception ==
Hien Nguyen of The Kraze describe the song as having mysterious and dark vibes that talk about falling into someone deep and are reminiscent of their previous title track "Oh My God. Writing for Genius, Sofia Gomez wrote the song "reaches the point of losing yourself with an erratic emotional shift" that will give a "mysterious aura" to the listeners feeling goosebumps. "After absorbing so much negativity from the world and toxic relationships, you fall deep into a persona that’s no longer your original self." In his album review for The Korea Herald, Park Jun-hee remarked that "X-file refers to a case deemed unsolvable". He pointed out that in the song, (G)I-dle 'continuously declares, "Kill the truth/me, and you/I cannot end anything" – [whispering] a dark truth into people's ears, its [sic] no doubt that this track will be added to many playlists. It’s that good.' Madison Murray writing for The Honey Pop cited it as a " normal love song" in the EP but with "a bit of twist". She describes "Dark" as the "kind of thrilling, adrenaline-filled romance that comes to those who are comfortable in their identity and being."

== X-File video ==
Before the album's release, on September 19, Cube released the album scheduler, which it stated that the X-File video would be slated for release on October 12. On the promised release date, a track video of the song was released on the group's official YouTube channel. It begins with Soyeon smiling while looking at her cell phone. Several concerning headlines about (G)I-dle's future, such as "(G)I-DLE are on the edge" and "Are they being forgotten?" can be seen in the video. Then the camera cuts to a shot of Shuhua and Minnie. There is a scene where Miyeon and Yuqi wander with empty eyes behind the gorgeous visuals, and the dark atmosphere is doubled throughout the video.

"We wanted to use that to tell people that everyone is getting judgments and everyone is getting those comments. It’s not because we are famous and because we are singers that [this doesn’t happen to us]. So we just wanted to tell people to not care about it. [...] Life is about ups and downs, but we just want to focus on ourselves. We kept doing this, and I think we will keep doing this. That’s our attitude."

— Yuqi on the concerning headlines about (G)I-dle's future, The Recording Academy

== Charts ==
Chart performance for "Dark (X-File)"
Chart (2022)	Peak position
South Korea (Circle)	147
