= I Love (EP) =

2022 EP by (G)I-dle

- Digital cover

EP by (G)I-dle
- Released: October 17, 2022
- Recorded: 2022
- Studio: Cube Studios
- Genres: Pop; dance-pop; ballad; jazz; rock; indie pop
- Length: 18:32
- Languages: Korean; English
- Labels: Cube; Kakao
- Producer: Jeon So-yeon

(G)I-dle chronology
I Never Die (2022)	I Love (2022)	I Feel (2023)

Physical edition covers
- Born, Act, and X-file versions, left to right

Singles from I Love
- 1. "Nxde" Released: October 17, 2022

I Love (stylized in sentence case) is the fifth Korean extended play (seventh overall) by South Korean girl group (G)I-dle. It was released digitally on October 17, 2022, and physically on October 18, 2022, by Cube Entertainment. It consists of three physical versions: Born, Act, and X-file. The EP contains six tracks, including the lead single "Nxde". The EP discusses various kinds of love and emotions of a person who is looking for real love – ultimately loving themselves. The tracks in the EP are listed in reverse as it narrates the process of love, starting with track 6 of someone experiencing love for the first time to track 1 of loving themselves. The EP took the form of vintage Hollywood-inspired concept.

The group retains its reputation as a "self-made" idol group by having three members participate in the lyrics and composition and arrangement of all six tracks. Leader Soyeon composed and arranged the title track and heavily participated in the writing process of every song on the project. Meanwhile, Minnie and Yuqi composed four of the tracks on I Love, with Minnie having writing credits for two of them. The EP also keeps the group's consistency with the 'I' theme, following I Never Die (2022). Commercially, the album debuted at number one on the Circle Chart with over 500,000 copies.

== Name ==
The album's title, I Love has no object to the sentence of the album name. The group explained that they want to respect all types of love and leave it to each listener to substitute with their own form of love – "can be family, friend, hobby, lover, dream, or one of the many kinds of love out there". I Love also has meanings of embodies the audacious aspiration that "'I' deserve to stay to 'myself' instead of being what others want me to be and that I hope to throw away the show which I don't want, and instead present the genuine, true self."

== Background and release ==
The concept for I Love was first mentioned by Soyeon on an episode of I Live Alone that aired on May 13, 2022. The program showed Soyeon assemble Cube staff meeting for their group (G)I-dle's next album where she introduced the new album presentation material she prepared herself using the Microsoft PowerPoint. She quoted Nirvana's Kurt Cobain, "I’d rather be hated for who I am than loved for who I am not."

" 'I'd rather be hated for who I am than to be loved for who I am not' is the main message I wish to convey. I want that to be the main message of our next title song." [...] "Like our previous album, this one is to beat the stereotypes, 'Even if you stopped loving me, I would choose to be who I am.' "

— Soyeon on I Love's core message, I Live Alone

Soyeon stated in the same program the album was inspired by the late actress Marilyn Monroe. She stated that she wanted to break the image of a "dumb blonde" and show how she was a smart woman. She also elaborated on her positive retrospect on Monroe and said that on the album, she wanted to show Monroe's true self rather than her persona as a sex symbol: the latter status having been earned from the blonde stereotype. To express the concept of this album visually, Soyeon explained the necessity of the (platinum blonde, red-lipped, lingerie-clad) look to convey the theme to Shuhua properly. Shuhua contemplated it for 2–3 days before accepting Jeon's proposal. The other members were touched by the makeover Shuhua went through and vowed to make this album a success. The group had multiple styles planned out in case Shuhua didn't want to dye her hair blonde, "[the blonde style] required to have consent from all five members. So, there was another style planned, but this style always existed. And I [Jeon] was expecting it not to make it."

In an interview with SBS Originals Hanbam, the group revealed that I Love's preparation was completed before they began the Just Me ( )I-dle World Tour, which they held between June 17 – October 1, 2022.

=== Marketing ===
On September 14, 2022, Cube premiered the first teaser live on the group's YouTube channel—which they manage. It simply featured an animation of a red beating heart with sound effects and counted down 10 minutes before breaking to reveal the album title I Love. The agency also shared an artwork teaser image of a heart cushion on the cover of the magazine across all the group's social media accounts, and that I Love would be released on October 17, 2022. On September 19, they released an album scheduler which shows the group's promotion schedule beginning September 30 until the release date (Oct 17).

On September 30, the artwork was unveiled for the lead single to be titled "Nxde" ('x' replacing 'u' in 'nude') on the group's official SNS accounts and website. The single cover consists of all five members, presumably topless, wearing red lipstick and dyed blonde hair. That same day, a short sketch film for I Love was released. The monochromatic sketch film begins with the phrase 'How Do I Look?' as (G)I-dle's photoshoot begins and proceeds to shots of the members' bodies as they slip off their clothes. It draws attention by foretelling a new challenge for the group with an unconventional and daring direction projecting the concept of power, confidence, freedom, and body autonomy. A series of group teaser images were unveiled on October 1–3. The next day, the album's track listing with style resembling that of a fashion magazine was issued, with the tracks being listed in reverse counting down to "Nxde". On October 10, an audio snippet for each track was released except "Dark (X-File)". Alongside the announcement, "Dark (X-File)" track video was scheduled to be released on October 12, five days before their full EP came out. On October 14, an I Love interview was released. On October 15 and 16, music video teasers were released through the group's official social media.

== Music and lyrics ==
I Love consists of six tracks from various genres of music such as dance, medium-tempo ballads, jazz, pop, rock, indie pop and more. All tracks were mainly produced and written by the members, especially Soyeon, while Minnie and Yuqi worked on "Change" and "Sculpture" as well as "Reset" and "Dark (X-File)" respectively. Soyeon also took the lead in the overall production of the album as the general producer. In addition to the members, a variety of songwriter-producers also participated: Pop Time, Kako, Big Sancho, BreadBeat, BoyToy (Blatinum), Disko (Blatinum), PLZ, Houdini, and Siixk Jun, most of who the group has worked with previous songs. It is an album that contains various kinds of love and emotions of a person who is looking for real love – ultimately loving ourselves. The tracklist of the EP is listed in reverse. Hours before the official release of I Love, the group held a media showcase named 'X-Love Show' to discuss the making of the album. Jeon explained that the album storyline started with track six to track one, stated "the story continues in reverse order from number 6. If number 6 is the first time we started to love, then from number 5 to number 2 contains the process of love."

=== Songs ===
The opening track of the album, "Nxde", featuring an alternative pop genre that samples an aria from Georges Bizet's 1875 opéra comique Carmen, "Habanera". It features a jazzy instrumental rhythm with grand bass line consisting of shuffle rhythm and sarcastic lyrics on the provocative views on the word 'nude', accompanied by whispering vocalizations by (G)I-dle. "Dark (X-File)" has been described as having mysterious and dark vibes that talk about falling into someone deep and are reminiscent of their previous title track "Oh My God". "Sculpture" has vintage-style track with light and upbeat melody in contrasts its self-deprecating lyrics about changing yourself for someone you love: "I'll become whatever you want me to be/It’s okay, I’m your sculpture." "Reset" is a ballad, with lyrics about believing that love is the only thing that cannot be achieved even with great effort. "Change" is a mellow song about the ups and downs of life and how they are unavoidable. "Love" is a soft rock song with melodic electric guitar riffs and a catchy chorus. The song talks about breaking up with an ex but ends up with the beautiful realization that the only real love is with oneself: "Thank you for helping me find real love/My love is (Guess who?)/That's me, she's my love."

== Critical reception ==
Professional ratings
Review scores
Source	Rating
Genius	4/5
NME	3/5 stars

Writing for Genius, Sofia E. Gomez regarded the album as "impressive" as it contains the "thoughtfulness and authenticity" found in its lyrics " giving listeners a glimpse into the harsh realities of breaking away or succumbing to outside stereotypes and judgment. Touching on themes of self-love, toxic relationships, and destructive behaviours" she thanked (G)I-dle for their "authentic and baring" for everyone to see as "they're no longer tied down to society’s outdated beliefs and are ready to reveal what makes them one-of-a-kind — especially as they stand by their confident nature to be – bold, raw, and evocative with no fear." In his album review for The Korea Herald, Park Jun-hee considered I Love as not the typical love talk album many would find. He lauded the group for tackling "vulnerable topics" of self-love and self-care, an issue many are shy of in K-pop. He pointed out that all six tracks in the album, "will sense that it's a story of a brokenhearted person, or a hopeless romantic, who can now find love for themselves. And at the end, they find out that to be able to give love to others, it's pivotal to hug yourself first."

== Commercial performance ==
On October 11, the EP surpassed 700,000 copies in pre-orders, setting a new record as Cube Entertainment's most pre-ordered and potentially bestselling album of all time, as the agency never sold more than 500,000 copies before. This EP is predicted to exceed Cube's total consolidated sales for the first half of 2022.

According to Hanteo Chart on October 21, I Love surpassed 610,000 copies sold, on the fifth day of its release. On the day of it release, the album surpassed 227,416 copies sold on Circle Retail Album Chart. on Circle album charts it debuted at number one with 637,090 copies. A 284% increase in the growth rate compared to the group's previous album I Never Die.

== Artwork and packaging ==
The physical album was released in three versions with three concepts: Born, Act, and X-file. In Act version (G)I-dle exuded a provocative and seductive atmosphere with various heart-shaped objects. All the members are dressed in retro lingeries reminiscent of vintage silver screen divas and 1920s flappers. This version portrays the double-sidedness of love, and the Born concept shows the visuals inspired by Hollywood figure Marilyn Monroe. In the X-file version, the group shows their charms while covering their faces with a rabbit mask, creating an intimate and strange atmosphere that shows what lies underneath artists who are loved by everyone. The EP comes with a CD, photo book, lyric sheets, two selfie cards, a bookmark, a sticker, a mini poster, a postage stamp, and a poster which is only available for pre-order. The Target exclusive versions will contain an additional photo card. The album also came in jewel cases as well, and there will be five versions covering all five members of the group.

== Promotion ==
To commemorate the release of the album, the group partnered up with Ktown4u, AppleMusic, Dearmymuse, Withmuu, and Namil Music to open a one-on-one video call event page. On October 4, Cube launched the (G)I-dle's I Love exclusive emoji for using the promotional hashtags "여자아이들", "GIDLE", "I_love", and "Nxde". These emojis will be effective until November 30, 2022. A pop-up store at Ketapo, Seoul to commemorate the release of I Love opened from October 18 – 20. The store included a photo booth that reproduced a four-cut photo frame with a hand-drawn hand-painted design by the members. Other products and attractions included an undisclosed photo card and photo cards with the members' signatures. (G)I-dle held an offline event X-Love Show Private Premiere, on the release date of the EP, Friday, October 17 at CGV Cheongdam Cine City, Seoul. The set and format of the media screening took the form of a late-night talk show set that was popular in the United States at the time when Monroe was active.

== Accolades ==
Awards and nominations
Organization	Year	Category	Result	Ref.
Korean Music Awards	2023	Best K-Pop Album	Nominated	

== Track listing ==
I Love track listing
No.	Title	Lyrics	Music	Arrangement	Length
1.	"Nxde"	Soyeon	Soyeon; Pop Time; Kako	Pop Time; Kako; Soyeon	2:58
2.	"Love"	Soyeon	Soyeon; Big Sancho (YummyTone)	Big Sancho; Soyeon	3:17
3.	"Change"	Minnie; Soyeon	Minnie; BreadBeat	BreadBeat	3:24
4.	"Reset"	Soyeon	Yuqi; Boytoy (Blatinum); Disko (Blatinum); PLZ (Blatinum)	Yuqi; Boytoy; Disko	3:02
5.	"Sculpture" (조각품; Jogakpum)	Soyeon; Minnie; Houdini	Minnie; Houdini	Houdini; Lo (Raw)	3:06
6.	"Dark (X-File)"	Soyeon	Yuqi; Siixk Jun	Siixk Jun	2:45
Total length:					18:32

== Charts ==
=== Weekly charts ===
Chart performance for I Love
Chart (2022–2023)	Peak position
Belgian Albums (Ultratop Flanders)	24
Belgian Albums (Ultratop Wallonia)	58
Croatian International Albums (HDU)	7
Hungarian Albums (MAHASZ)	34
French Physical Albums (SNEP)	125
German Albums (Offizielle Top 100)	70
Japanese Albums (Oricon)	20
Japanese Combined Albums (Oricon)	21
Japanese Hot Albums (Billboard Japan)	85
South Korean Albums (Circle)	1
UK Album Downloads (Official Charts)	75
US Billboard 200	71
US World Albums (Billboard)	4

=== Monthly charts ===
Monthly chart performance for I Love
Chart (2022)	Peak position
South Korean Albums (Circle)	2

=== Year-end charts ===
Year-end chart performance for I Love
Chart (2022)	Position
South Korean Albums (Circle)	22

== Sales and certifications ==
Sales and certifications for I Love
Region	Certification	Certified units/sales
South Korea (KMCA)	3× Platinum	839, 266

== Release history ==
Release formats for I Love
Region	Date	Format	Version	Label	Ref.
Various	October 17, 2022	Digital download; streaming	Digital	Cube; Kakao	
South Korea	October 17, 2022	CD	Standard; Jewel	Cube; Kakao	
Various	October 18, 2022	CD	Standard; Jewel	Cube; Kakao	
United States	October 21, 2022	CD	Exclusive	Cube; Universal	
United States	October 21, 2022	CD	Standard	Cube; Universal	
