= Nxde =

2022 single by (G)I-dle

- Steve Aoki remix cover

Single by (G)I-dle

from the EP I Love
- Language: Korean; English
- Released: October 17, 2022
- Studio: Cube Studio
- Genre: Alternative pop
- Length: 2:58
- Label: Cube; Kakao
- Composers: Soyeon; Pop Time; Kako
- Lyricist: Soyeon
- Producer: Soyeon

(G)I-dle singles chronology
"Tomboy" (2022)	"Nxde" (2022)	"Queencard" (2023)

Music video
- "Nxde" on YouTube

"Nxde" (pronounced "nude") is a song by South Korean girl group (G)I-dle. It was released through Cube Entertainment on October 17, 2022, as the lead single of the group's fifth extended play, I Love (2022). It was written, composed, and arranged by Soyeon, with additional composition and arrangement credits by PopTime and Kako. Musically, it is an alternative pop track that samples the aria "Habanera" from Georges Bizet's 1875 opéra comique Carmen. The song utilizes jazzy instrumentations; its lyrics revolve around the notion of expressing one's true self.

"Nxde" was met with generally positive reviews from critics, who praised its production, lyricism and noted its themes of female empowerment, self-love, objectification and hypersexualization of women by the media and public. It was a commercial success in South Korea, topping the Circle Digital Chart, and became the group's second number-one single on the chart. Later, the song was certified gold by the RIAJ in Japan.

The accompanying music video was created by Soyeon, who heavily took inspiration from Marilyn Monroe and Banksy, while it was directed by Son Seung-hee of High Quality Fish, who directed the group's previous work. "Nxde" received airplay on KMVQ-FM, a radio station in San Francisco, California, within a day of its release, marking the first time a Korean-language song by a K-pop girl group debuted on an American radio station. It peaked at number forty on Billboard's Pop Airplay chart, making (G)I-dle the first act from an independent label to chart with a non-English song.

== Background and release ==
On September 30, 2022, the group unveiled the artwork poster for the title song through the group's official SNS accounts and website, revealing "Nxde" as the lead single. The poster is a shot of the members' heads to shoulders, highlighting their individuality with different tones of blonde hair and red lips, raising the expectations for the new song. Simultaneously, the group released I Love sketch film that contains a preview of the EP which begins with the phrase 'How Do I Look?' in the black and white screen as (G)I-dle's photoshoot begins and proceeds to shots of the members' bodies as they slip off their clothes. In particular, it draws attention by foretelling a new challenge for the group with an unconventional and daring direction projecting the concept of power, confidence, freedom, and body autonomy.

Cube sent "Nxde" to San Francisco's radio airplay Now FM station on October 18, 2022. Station 99.7's Jazzy Jim Archer said, "As soon as I heard the music, I wanted to give it to the listeners quickly. It is probably the first time I have played a sound source other than English or Latin on the radio. They will do well in the conservative radio media and overcome that barrier." An official from the US record industry also said, "Nxde's radio debut is a historical event as it can be seen that language is not a barrier to K-pop's entry into the global market". The remix version by American DJ Steve Aoki was released on December 16.

== Music and lyrics ==
=== Composition ===
" The word 'nude' can be perceived as provocative, and people may think, 'Why is it 'nude'? Isn't it too explicit?' But when I thought of the word 'nude', I thought of my true self, not an undressed version of me. I consider nude not as just being naked, but being bare."

— Soyeon on the meaning of "Nxde",

"Nxde" was written, composed, and arranged by Soyeon, with additional composition and arrangement handled by PopTime and Kako. "Nxde" is described as an alternative pop work that samples an aria from Georges Bizet's 1875 opéra comique Carmen, "Habanera". It features a jazzy instrumentation with a grand bass line, consisting of a shuffle rhythm and sarcastic lyrics on the provocative views on the word 'nude', accompanied by whispering vocalizations by the members. A part of the song briefly references Lorelei Lee, a character Marilyn Monroe played in Gentlemen Prefer Blondes (1953), as a philosophy-obsessed bookworm and self-made woman. The song deliberately uses the term 'Nxde' to tease 'bare' as the true self rather than taking off any outer clothing – the song's last verse reads, 'I'm born nude/the lewd one is you/Rude'.

=== Theme ===
On the "I Love" interview, released on October 14, (G)I-dle gave a glimpse of the comeback concept with a montage-style monochrome video. In the clip, the members spoke in their native languages (Korean, Thai, Standard Chinese, and Taiwanese Mandarin). Shriya Swami of HITC calls it "a very raw and heart-touching experience."

Soyeon explained, "We just wanted to show everything. I mean...To an extent where we don't have anything on?" Minnie shares how their new era is "beyond people's expectations." The girls almost bared all for the sultry concept; as Miyeon details, "We already know what people like to see us wearing," Yuqi continues, "We will throw away all the shackles and burdens." The members further open up about letting people "see the real side of us." Shuhua expresses how they "don't have high hopes" and "don't ever wish for anybody to count on us." Before ending the clip, Soyeon warns the fans as she says, "We are completely nude...even you, will have to get ready for it "

— (G)I-dle speaking of showing their true selves for this comeback, HITC

== Reception ==
"Nxde" has received mostly positive critical reception, with most reviewers commenting on its theme of empowerment. Shriya Swami of HITC wrote: "In their empowering 'blonde' era, the girls are flawless with all the glitz and glamour as they deliver the statement of being more than just their looks." Writing for Genius, Sofia Gomez emphasizes that the album is to "fight misconceptions and stereotypes towards women" and "directly calls out individuals that look up the song for an objectionable" and "those that oversexualize women". The author also affirmed that "(G)I-dle has once again used their privilege as idols to bring awareness to the harm women endure from societal expectations." The Standard Pop's Hathaitarn Chatlertmongkol opined that (G)I-dle attempts to break the framework of gender stereotypes further in "Nxde", terming it a "redefine "Tomboy" in its own right". Ahn Yu-jin of Star News commented that "What they want to say through nude not only represents their opinion but the mind of women and children. [...] Their steps are the path that popular art should take." The writer also pointed out the positive impact on the word "nude" on domestic and foreign search portals akin to Park Chan-wook's film The Handmaiden (2016). BuzzFeed named it as one of the Best Career Comeback of 2022. Ranking it as number 88 in their list of the top 100 songs of 2022, Rolling Stone called the song's "lyrics and the video, 'Nxde' addresses the objectification of women in a way that's rare for a K-pop girl group." When selecting "Nxde" as one of the 79 Best K-Pop Songs released 2022, Malvika Padinis of Teen Vogue said "Nxde" is a "clapback of epic proportions led by powerful lyricism and a seamless blend of infectious sonics and eye-catching aesthetics.", and praised all five members as they have "established themselves as an emblem of multiculturalism with their amalgamation of Chinese, Thai, and Korean culture, and continue to deliver unique artistry led by poignant messages and artistic concepts."

"Nxde" on select critic lists
Critic/Publication	List	Rank	Ref.
Idology	Top 20 Songs of 2022	Placed	
Insider	The Best K-pop songs of 2022, ranked	6	
Rolling Stone	The 100 Best Songs of 2022	88	
Teen Vogue	The 79 Best K-Pop Songs of 2022	Placed	

=== Impact ===
The song's title, "Nxde", positively affected the search function of the social media portal. The word "(G)I-dle's nude" has occupied inappropriate keywords such as "child nude (아이들 누드)" and "girl nude (여자아이들 누드)". The name (G)I-dle '(여자)아이들' in Korean comes from girl '여자' and children '아이들'. Although the song is stylized as 'Nxde', it is still written out in Korean as '누드'. Thus, the inappropriate keywords were pushed down and replaced with '(G)I-dle Nxde' or '(G)I-dle nude' media articles, pictures, videos, stage photos, broadcast captures, album or song information, etc. Oh Myung-gi of Dispatch wrote in his article, "One's unembellished, the natural state was expressed using the word 'nude.' It shatters the R-rated images one associate with the word."

== Commercial performance ==
"Nxde" was a commercial success in South Korea. Upon release, it topped all real-time charts in South Korea and achieved their second perfect all-kill (PAK) of 2022, making (G)I-dle the fourth group in K-pop history to have multiple PAKs within the same year, after 2NE1 (2011), Big Bang (2015) and Twice (2016). The song peaked at number one on the Circle Digital Chart, becoming the group's second number-one single.

In Singapore, the song debuted at number 15 on the RIAS Top Regional Chart in the chart issue dated October 14–20, 2022. The song debuted at number 21 on Billboard Taiwan Songs issue dated October 29, 2022 and at number 13 on the Billboard US World Digital Song Sales during the same week.

== Music video ==
On October 15 and 16, music video teasers were released through the group's official social media, which was followed with the official music video's release the next day. The visual was directed by Son Seung-hee (Samsonii) of High Quality Fish production team, and the set design was led by art director Lee Jungae. Within 24 hours of its release, the video topped YouTube's trending page and surpassed 24 million views. By October 27, it received 74 million views on the platform.

A dance performance video for the song was released on October 23, 2022. The choreography was created by Moon Tae-eun, a member of South Korean boy band The Vish, and Kiel Tutin, who previously choreographed the group's previous single "Tomboy".

=== Synopsis and reception ===
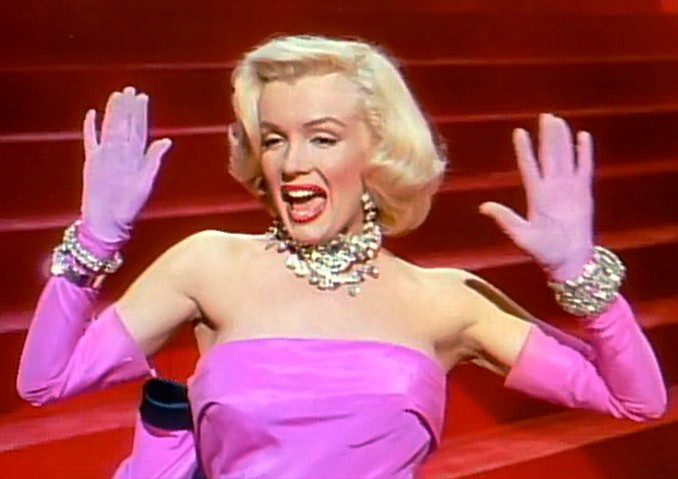
The music video takes inspiration from various Marilyn Monroe scenes, including one from Gentlemen Prefer Blondes (1953).

The video depicts the members as movie stars in "showgirl-inspired fashion" along with numerous references to "iconic" Marilyn Monroe moments. The music video opens with a poster welcoming viewers to a "wild, wicked and wonderful show" titled Nude. What follows is a scene of Soyeon wearing flappers, on the piano singing, "Why you think (that) 'bout nude/'cause your view's so rude/Think outside the box/Then you'll like it." Minnie appears onscreen wearing a pink dress, followed by Yuqi wearing Chanel No. 5, which is a perfume Monroe wore before going to bed. In the dressing room, Soyeon is seen wearing a bullet bra and holding a book of Leaves of Grass, a collection of poems by Walt Whitman that Monroe once read and is known for its mysterious and esoteric works, and rips up a newspaper that has the writing of Monroe's life and public scrutiny. In the video, the group catches the eye of the public by becoming influencers of works whether as statues, or being displayed in a glass box. In another scene, Soyeon is seen live through her phone, and the screen is full of criticism that they are somewhat incompetent and disrespectful. An animated character, a reference to Jessica Rabbit, is shown who is poorly portrayed by the people because of her femme fatale image, contrary to her true self – Like her signature line 'I'm not bad. I'm just drawn that way.' The video then cuts to a scene of (G)I-dle's version painting that says 'nude' across a figure of a woman being destroyed at a museum, thus portraying a rebellion against social norms and the breaking of limits. The destruction of the painting referenced Banksy's Love Is in the Bin piece, which infamously self-shredded upon being auctioned for $25 million. Towards the end of the video, it stated in bold red text on a black background that "Marilyn Monroe and Banksy inspired the video. Thank you, and love you".

Lee Hwa-yun wrote in an article for GQ Korea that "(G)I-dle ultimately goes to the message of 'I will wear the beautiful me', regardless of how the public sees them. The 'luxury nude' they draw is not the erotic work that the public expected, like Jessica Rabbit's shattered nude. It means to wear yourself as you are, even if you are not loved or look good. And, 'Think outside the box/then you'll like it', [the group] boldly invite the public to a wider world." Some speculated that the character is the group's former member, Seo Soo-jin due to the visual similarity, while also noting that Soojin herself referenced Monroe numerous times as her inspiration when she was a member of the group, suggesting that the group could've also used "Nxde" as a homage to their former member. Sofia Gomez of Genius regarded that "the self-destruction became a performative spectacle that rejected the commercialization of art with its sole intent of humiliation. In connection to (G)I-dle's message, both the painting and music video criticize how as art, they're undermined and reduced to what society gains from them — taking away their worth and significance." And after the nude painting is shredded, they deliver the final verse, "You are the perverted one". DD of Rolling Stone India named "Nxde" as "(G)I-dle's rebellion as they boldly declare their intentions to challenge perspectives through their music, even if that results in a dip in public affection."

Year-end lists for "Nxde"
Critic/Publication	List	Rank	Ref.
Rolling Stone India	The 10 Best Korean Music Videos of 2022	7	
Tidal	K-Pop Videos: Best of 2022	30	

=== Costume design ===
Vogue Hong Kong noted that in the music video (G)I-dle wore 3 group costumes, and each member had at least two sets of fashion styles to play the classic style of Marilyn Monroe. Minnie wears a pink turtleneck suede dress from Vetements and a crystal necklace from Alessandra Rich to recreate Monroe's pink dress in Gentlemen Prefer Blondes (1953). Song Yuqi replaced The Seven Year Itch (1955) classic white pleated skirt with what Katherine Ho described as the 'K-pop version' of the outfit—a Zimmermann white dress. The intention of their fashion choice for Song was to subvert the restrictive stereotype of the sexy Monroe by showing a youthful and energetic side. Soyeon's first look for "Nxde" featured a tapered top by Jean Paul Gaultier and Lotta Volkova, emphasizing the feminine aspect. The piece was a callback to the infamous cone bra that Gaultier also designed for Madonna's Blond Ambition World Tour (1990). In another scene, Soyeon depicts herself as a white sculpture—sporting platinum blonde hair fixed in a ponytail. She paired it with retro silhouette tailoring made by Korean designer Kowgi. Greek statue Shuhua wore a Retrofête metallic green evening dress, a reference to Monroe's green dress in the film River of No Return (1954). The concept of "nude" was expressed by wearing a skin-toned top and maxi skirt.

== Promotion ==
Prior to the release of I Love, on October 17, 2022, the group held a live event called "X-Love Show Private Premiere" to introduce the album and its songs, including "Nxde", with the attendance from the media press and 112 winners from the Makestar event. (G)I-dle promoted the song on various radio shows, including Naver Now, Miyeon's Gossip Idle, KBS Cool FM, Minhyuk's Kiss the Radio on October 19, and Youngjae's Got7 Youngjae's Best Friend. On October 19, they performed the song for the first time on M Countdown followed with a performance on Music Bank the next day. They appeared on Show! Music Core on the 22nd and Inkigayo on the 23rd. They appeared on The Show on October 25, followed by Music Bank and Show Champion on the afternoon of 26th and 28th.

== Accolades ==
Awards and nominations for "Nxde"
Year	Organization	Award	Result	Ref.
2023	Circle Chart Music Awards	Song of the Year – October	Nominated	

Music program awards for "Nxde"
Program	Date (11 total)	Ref.
The Show	October 25, 2022	
Show Champion	October 26, 2022	
Show Champion	November 9, 2022	
M Countdown	October 27, 2022	
Music Bank	October 28, 2022	
Show! Music Core	October 29, 2022	
Show! Music Core	November 12, 2022	
Show! Music Core	November 19, 2022	
Inkigayo	November 6, 2022	
Inkigayo	November 13, 2022	
Inkigayo	November 20, 2022	

Melon Popularity Award
Award	Date (2022)	Ref.
Weekly Popularity Award	October 24	
Weekly Popularity Award	November 7	

== Credits and personnel ==
Credits adapted from album liner notes, High Quality Fish and OH!ArtCrew.

Location

- Cube Studio – recording
- Ingrid Studio – digital editing
- Klang Studio – mixing
- Studio Shelter – animation

Song credits

- (G)I-dle – vocals
  - Soyeon – background vocals, lyrics, composition, arrangement
- Pop Time – composition, arrangement
- Kako – background vocals, composition, arrangement
- Jenci – background vocals
- Kim Ho-hyun – guitar
- Park Ji-young – keyboard
- Choi Ye-ji – recording
- Jung Eun-kyung – digital editing
- Koo Jong-pil – mixing

Visual credits

- Moon Tae-eun – choreographer
- Kiel Tutin – choreographer
- Son Seung-hee (High Quality Fish) – music video director
- High Quality Fish – executive producer
- Jang Hong-suk, Kim Yong, Jin Young-hun, Lee Dong-hyun, Ahn Hyo-jun, and Park Kyeong-won – art team
- Yun Inmo (ATOD) – director of photography
- Kim Woo-seok– digital imaging technicians
- Jimmy Motion production – jib
- Park Jun-hee – gaffer
- Jeon Seong-gang (J Show) – Stage lights
- Lee Jungae – art director
- Park Ji-won – 2D animation director
- Song Ji-yeon – senior animator
- Juan Ha, Lee Sung-hwan, Han Da-hye, Choi Hyeon-hye, Seon Ha-jin – animator
- Park Chou-young (Dragon) – special effects
- Lee Ha-neul – project manager
- Kim Laon – producer

== Charts ==
=== Weekly charts ===
Weekly chart performance
Chart (2022–2023)	Peak position
Global 200 (Billboard)	50
Hong Kong (Billboard)	9
Japan (Japan Hot 100)	95
Malaysia (Billboard)	21
New Zealand Hot Singles (RMNZ)	18
Singapore (RIAS)	16
South Korea (Circle)	1
Taiwan (Billboard)	1
US Pop Airplay (Billboard)	40
US World Digital Song Sales (Billboard)	13
Vietnam (Vietnam Hot 100)	29

=== Monthly charts ===
Monthly chart performance
Chart (2022)	Position
South Korea (Circle)	2

=== Year-end charts ===
2022 year-end chart performance for "Nxde"
Chart (2022)	Position
South Korea (Circle)	85

2023 year-end chart performance for "Nxde"
Chart (2023)	Position
South Korea (Circle)	36

== Certifications ==
Certifications
Region	Certification	Certified units/sales
Streaming
Japan (RIAJ)	Gold	50,000,000^{†}
^{†} Streaming-only figures based on certification alone.

== Release history ==
Release history
Region	Date	Format	Version	Label	Ref
South Korea	October 17, 2022	Digital download; streaming	Original	Cube; Kakao	
Various	October 17, 2022	Digital download; streaming	Original	Cube	
United States	October 18, 2022	Radio airplay	Original	Cube	
Various	December 16, 2022	Digital download; streaming	Steve Aoki remix	Cube	

== See also ==
- List of Circle Digital Chart number ones of 2022
- List of K-pop songs on the Billboard charts
- List of K-pop songs on the World Digital Song Sales chart
- List of The Show Chart winners (2022)
- List of Show Champion Chart winners (2022)
- List of M Countdown Chart winners (2022)
- List of Music Bank Chart winners (2022)
- List of Show! Music Core Chart winners (2022)
