= A Page =

- Digital cover

Single album by Yuqi
- Released: May 13, 2021
- Genre: Pop rock; dance-rock
- Length: 6:23
- Language: English
- Label: Cube; Republic; Kakao

Yuqi chronology
A Page (2021)	Grey Track (2023)

Singles from A Page
- 1. "Giant" Released: May 13, 2021; 2. "Bonnie & Clyde" Released: May 21, 2021

A Page (stylized in sentence case) is the debut single album released by Chinese singer-songwriter Yuqi. The album was released digitally on May 13, 2021, by Cube Entertainment. The album consists of two lead singles, "Giant" and "Bonnie and Clyde".

== Background and release ==
On May 6, 2021, Cube Entertainment unveiled the artwork teaser of Yuqi's first single album A Page through the official SNS channel of (G)I-dle. A highlight medley a track in the album was released on May 11. An accompanying animated music video for "Giant" was uploaded on (G)I-dle's official YouTube channel. The video illustrated a girl running hurriedly as if being chased by something to a forest, and the silhouette of a falling girl continued. At the end of the video, the girl holding the hand mirror that fell on the floor opened the closed door, and soon a bright light poured into the dark room.

On May 19, 2021, Cube Entertainment released the music video teaser for "Bonnie and Clyde". In the teaser released, Yuqi in a black suit is seen looking at herself in the mirror. Scenes such as timers, chessboards, and boiling pots quickly intersect. Then, she makes a hand-shooting gesture toward herself in the mirror. At the end of the video, shots were fired from her hand-shooting gesture, shattering the mirror. A blonde haired woman is dimly seen at the end of the video. The following day, Cube Entertainment released the second music video teaser for "Bonnie and Clyde". In it, Yuqi is behind the wheel of a car. The music video for "Bonnie and Clyde" was released on May 21, 2021.

The album was released on May 13, 2021.

== Music and lyrics ==
The album contains two singles. The songs were written and composed by Yuqi, BoyToy, Young Sky, Peter Hyun and ChaTone. The album's first track, "Giant," is a pop rock song that features drum sounds and lyrics about "overcoming pain and moving forward confidently without giving up". On the track, the singer narrates a story about a girl who "does not give up in the midst of scars, worries, and fears and advances like a giant". It was released with an animated music video that symbolizes the meaning. The second track, "Bonnie & Clyde," is an English-language dance-rock song influenced by the 90s trance and house beats. Its lyrics revolve around "distinct storytelling and bold lyrics". The song lyrics was inspired by the 1967 American film of the same name. South China Morning Post ranked the song No. 12 among "The 20 best K-pop songs of 2021."

== Promotion ==
Almost a year of the album release, Yuqi performed the band version of the two songs on one music program on MBC M's Show Champion on May 11, 2022.

== Track listing ==
A Page track listing
No.	Title	Lyrics	Music	Arrangement	Length
1.	"Giant"	Yuqi; BoyToy; Young Sky; Peter Hyun; ChaTone	Yuqi; BoyToy; Young Sky; Peter Hyun; ChaTone	BoyToy; Young Sky; Peter Hyun	3:29
2.	"Bonnie and Clyde"	Galeyn Tenhaeff; Catalina Schweighauser; Joel Strömgren; Benjamin Roustaing	Galeyn Tenhaeff; Catalina Schweighauser; Joel Strömgren; Benjamin Roustaing	Joel Strömgren	2:54
Total length:					6:23

== Release history ==
Release history for A Page
Region	Date	Format	Label
Various	May 13, 2021	Digital download; streaming	Cube; Republic; Kakao
