= Yuqi =

Chinese singer-songwriter (born 1999)

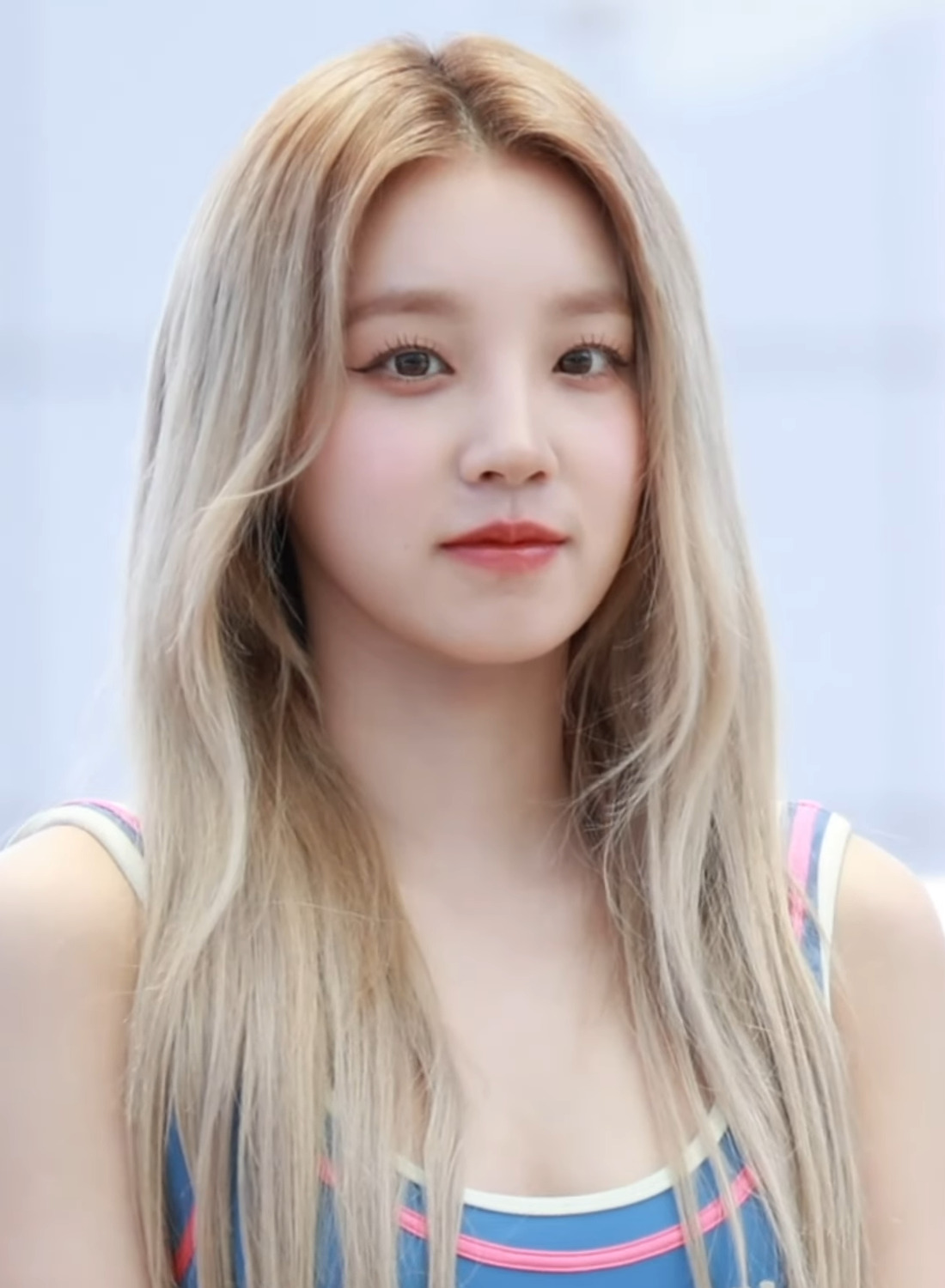
- Yuqi in 2023
- Born: Song Yuqi; September 23, 1999 (age 27); Beijing, China
- Occupations: Singer; songwriter
- Musical career
- Origin: Seoul, South Korea
- Genres: Dance-pop; K-pop; C-pop
- Instrument: Vocals
- Years active: 2018–present
- Labels: Cube; Hot Idol; T Entertainment
- Member of: I-dle; United Cube

Chinese name
- Traditional Chinese: 宋雨琦
- Simplified Chinese: 宋雨琦
- Hanyu Pinyin: Sòng Yǔqí
- Wade–Giles: Sung Yü-ch'i

Korean name
- Hangul: 우기
- RR: Ugi
- MR: Ugi

Song Yuqi (Chinese: 宋雨琦; born September 23, 1999) is a Chinese singer and songwriter. She is a member of the South Korean girl group I-dle, which debuted as (G)I-dle under Cube Entertainment in May 2018. She has been a cast member of the Chinese variety show Keep Running since 2019 and hosted the KakaoTV reality show Learn Way (2020–2021). In May 2021, Yuqi made her solo debut with a single album A Page.

== Life and career ==
=== 1999–2018: Early life and pre-debut activities ===
Song Yuqi was born on September 23, 1999, in Beijing, China. She attended Beijing 101 Middle School. In 2015, Yuqi attended the Cube Star World Audition Beijing Station, performing CLC's "High Heels" and G.E.M.'s "Bubble".

=== 2018–2020: (G)I-dle and solo activities ===
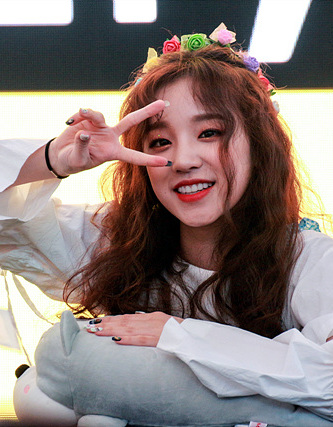
Yuqi in 2018

On April 8, 2018, Yuqi was revealed to be an upcoming member of Cube Entertainment's new girl group, (G)I-dle. She debuted with the group on May 2, 2018, with the lead single titled "Latata" of their debut extended play (EP), I Am.

In 2019, Yuqi became a cast member for the seventh season of the Chinese TV show Keep Running.

In April 2019, Yuqi was cast in a new variety show The Gashinas. The pilot episode aired on May 19. In June 2019, Yuqi was confirmed as part of the cast for Law of the Jungle in Myanmar. In September, Yuqi sang the ending theme for the Chinese reality show Please Pay Attention Visitors.

In May 2020, Yuqi debuted as a songwriter and composer with "I'm the Trend", a song dedicated to (G)I-dle's fanbase. On May 29, Yuqi was cast alongside WJSN's Exy and Yeoreum in 1theK Originals' game show The First Date. For (G)I-dle's first single album, Yuqi was credited for "Dumdi Dumdi" Chinese lyrics and guide alongside Z King. On September 17, KakaoTV launched an original entertainment program hosted by Yuqi, Learn Way. In October, Yuqi was cast in tvN's I'm a Survivor, a reality show where entertainers undergo survival training for natural disasters. On November 9, it was announced that Yuqi would participate in G-Star 2020 with Krafton, an e-sports reality show where celebrities and streamers entered a special school for PlayerUnknown's Battlegrounds Series 3. On November 22, Yuqi appeared on Play Seoul, a program produced by the Seoul Tourism Foundation and KBS with the aim of promoting safe post-COVID-19 tourism in Seoul. On November 30, Yuqi also appeared in Seoul Connects U, a variety travel show jointly planned and produced by MBC and Seoul Tourism Foundation.

On January 11, 2021, (G)I-dle released their fourth EP I Burn, on which Yuqi co-wrote and co-composed the song "Lost." Later that month, the group released a Chinese version of their lead single "Hwaa", with Chinese lyrics written by Yuqi.

=== 2021–present: Solo debut, China's activities, international collaborations ===
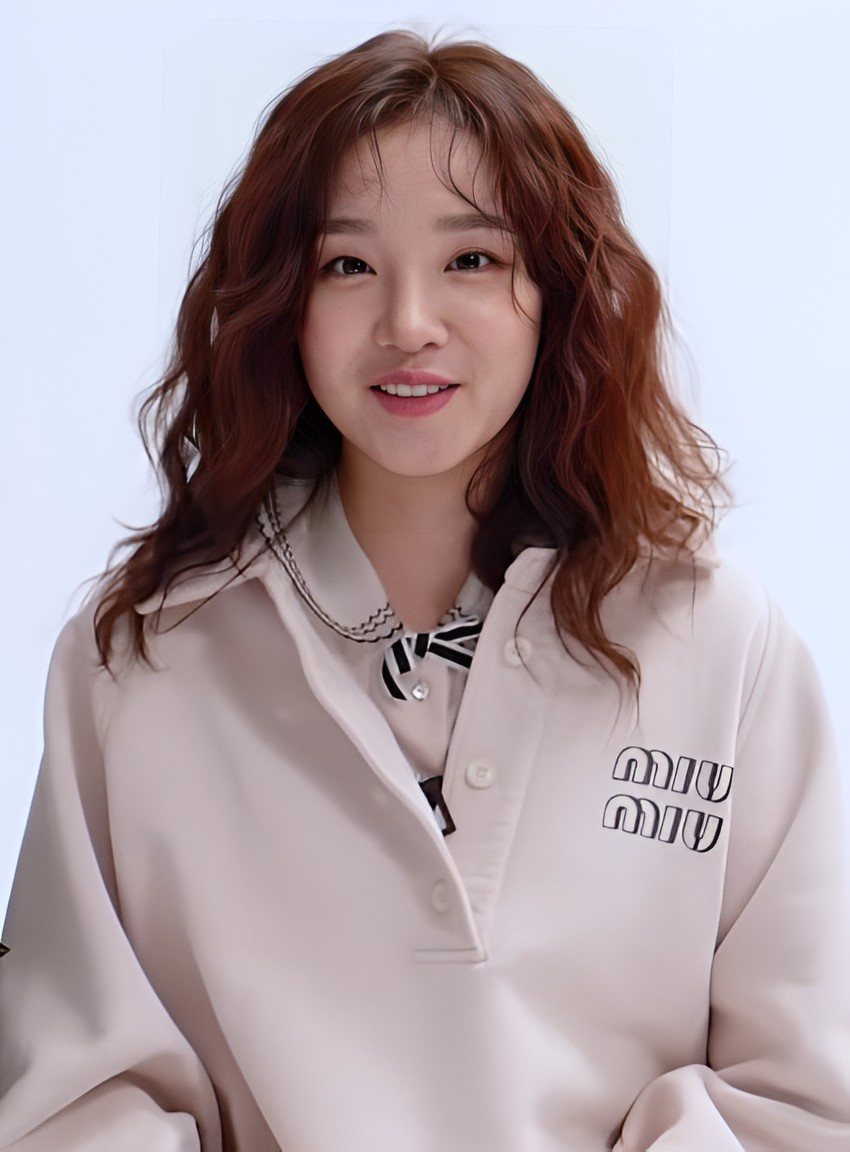
Yuqi in 2021

For most of 2021, Yuqi focused on promoting as a soloist in China. On May 6, 2021, Cube Entertainment announced that Yuqi would debut as a solo artist with single album A Page on May 13, which includes the lead singles "Giant" and "Bonnie & Clyde". In August, she became a contestant in the music talent survival show Stage Boom. On October 27, Yuqi participated in the Beijing 2022 Winter Olympics and Paralympic Games theme song "Salute to the Heroes". Throughout 2021, Yuqi also participated in multiple Chinese variety shows including Keep Running, Let's Fall In Love 3, 2060, and Shine! Super Brothers.

In late 2021, Yuqi returned to South Korea to prepare for (G)I-dle's comeback. On March 14, 2022, the group released their first studio album I Never Die, in which Yuqi participated in writing and composing the tracks "Polaroid" and "Liar." In April, she was cast as a panelist in the TVING web series Zero-Sum Game. Later that month, Yuqi's (G)I-dle groupmate Miyeon released her debut EP My on which Yuqi co-composed the track "Rain." In October, (G)I-dle released their fifth EP I Love, on which Yuqi co-composed the tracks "Reset" and "Dark (X-File)."

In February 2023, Yuqi and groupmate Miyeon released the song "Sweet Dream" as part of the soundtrack for the Netflix romantic comedy series Love to Hate You. Later in February, she collaborated with EDM producer team HypeerTime on the song "Not Cinderella" for the KakaoPage webtoon I Wasn't the Cinderella. In March, she was confirmed to return as a main cast member in season 11 of Keep Running. In May, (G)I-dle returned with their sixth EP I Feel, on which Yuqi participated in writing and composing the tracks "All Night" and "Peter Pan." In June, Yuqi was a featured artist on Choi Ye-na's "Hate Rodrigo", the lead single from Choi's second single album Hate XX. The following month, she made her acting debut in the Netflix original series Celebrity as Zhang Wei, a Chinese influencer. On September 5, Yuqi and Miyeon released the single "How to Twerk" as part of the soundtrack of the Mnet dance competition show Street Woman Fighter 2. Six days later, she was cast alongside Chuu and Billlie's Tsuki in the Studio X+U entertainment show Star of Star Girls.

On December 14, Yuqi collaborated with Alan Walker and Jvke on the single "Fire!" off of Walker's fifth studio album Walkerworld 2.0. On January 29, 2024, (G)I-dle released their second studio album 2, on which Yuqi co-wrote and co-composed the tracks "Doll" and "Rollie". On February 27, Yuqi released "Bad Liar", a special track from the tvN series Marry My Husband.

On March 22, 2024, it was announced that Yuqi would be making her Korean solo debut in April. On April 2, it was officially confirmed that she would be releasing her first EP Yuq1 on April 23, with the pre-release single "Could It Be" released on April 5. The lead single "Freak" and its accompanying music video were released together with the EP. On September 20, Yuqi released the promotional single "One" as part of the soundtrack for the Chinese release of Transformers One.

On March 14, 2025, a teaser was released stating that Yuqi would be releasing a digital single "Radio (Dum-Dum)", a medium-tempo boom bap track that compares a broken heart to a record, on March 17. On September 1, Cube Entertainment announced that Yuqi would be releasing her third single album Motivation on September 16, with the lead single "M.O.". The album's release was preceded by the release of a music video for the track "Gone" (아프다) on September 10, which starred Chinese actor Wang Anyu.

On September 23, 2026, it was announced that Yuqi's second EP 27 would be released on October 8.

== Personal life ==
Yuqi came to South Korea in 2016 and is known to have high-level Korean proficiency. Her Korean Proficiency level was certified in 2020 when she gained Level 5 out of 6 overall in the TOPIK test (222, 8 points below the level 6 score of 230). When asked about her language skills in KBS2's Happy Together 3, she answered, "Kim Soo-hyun was my Korean teacher. I fell in love with him after watching the drama My Love from the Star. I studied Korean with my mother with the drama."

In addition to Korean and her native Mandarin Chinese, Yuqi is also fluent in English.

== In the media ==
Yuqi has appeared on various South Korean entertainment shows such as KBS2 Happy Together 3, JTBC Knowing Bros, MBC Every 1 Korean Foreigners, and SBS Running Man. She was a special MC on SBS MTV's The Show and hosted her own show on KakaoTV, Learn Way. Yuqi was praised for her sense of entertainment and fluent Korean. Korean media has complimented her "Yoo Jae-seok-class sense of entertainment" and praised her "outstanding Korean skills that are different from those from other idol groups".

== Other ventures ==
=== Fashion and endorsements ===
Aside from various endorsements with her group, Yuqi has promoted various products and has been featured in numerous advertisements. During her trainee years, she was a model for the local South Korean skin care line Rising Star Cosmetics. On April 28, 2019, Yuqi was introduced as Vivlas new beauty brand model.

In 2021, Yuqi continued to grow in popularity, collaborating with Chinese brands such as Momenten, a sugar-free sparkling alcohol brand, Limeflare, a fashion and jewelry brand, and the cosmetics brand Carslan. On August 6, she was chosen to become the face of luxury sunglasses and eyeglasses Ray-Ban in Greater China due to her "brave[ness] in expressing her true self and full of positive energy."

In February 2023, Yuqi was announced as a brand spokesperson for a Chinese cosmetics brand named Into You. On January 8, 2024, Yuqi was announced as a brand ambassador for Fendi. Later that month, she became a brand ambassador for the online clothing brand Dekavv. In April 2024, she became a brand ambassador for Anessa, a Japanese sunscreen brand owned by Shiseido. In July, she was selected as the model for activewear brand Xexymix. In November, Yuqi was chosen as a brand ambassador for bags and shoes by luxury women's fashion label Tory Burch LLC. In December, she became a brand spokesperson for Adidas.

=== Ambassadorship ===
In 2021, Yuqi was appointed as the ambassador for the International Day of the Deaf, jointly organized by Baidu and Listening Foundation.

== Discography ==
=== Extended plays ===
List of extended plays, showing selected details, selected chart positions, sales figures, and certifications
Title	Details	Peak chart positions		Sales	Certifications
Title	Details	KOR	JPN	Sales	Certifications
Yuq1	Released: April 23, 2024; Label: Cube, Kakao; Formats: CD, digital download, streaming	2	42	KOR: 701,598; JPN: 1,389	KMCA: 2× Platinum
27 (二十七)	Released: October 8, 2026; Label: Cube, Kakao; Formats: CD, digital download, streaming; Track listing: 1. "Sadness" (快乐); 2. "Chamomile Tea"; 3. "I Like You"; 4. "Feels Right"; 5. "Dance of the Galaxy" (银河之舞); 6. "Stay"	—	—		

=== Single albums ===
List of single albums, showing selected details, selected chart positions, sales figures, and certifications
Title	Details	Peak chart positions	Sales	Certifications
Title	Details	KOR	Sales	Certifications
A Page	Released: May 13, 2021; Label: Cube, Republic, Kakao; Formats: Digital download, streaming	—		
Grey Track	Released: November 15, 2023 (China), November 28, 2023 (Worldwide); Label: Sony Music China; Formats: Digital download, streaming	—		
Motivation	Released: September 16, 2025; Label: Cube, Kakao; Formats: CD, digital download, streaming	2	KOR: 407,160	KMCA: Platinum

=== Singles ===
==== As lead artist ====
Title	Year	Peak chart positions		Album
Title	Year	CHN	KOR	Album
"Giant"	2021	—	— (Note: "Giant" did not enter the Gaon Digital Chart but peaked at number 27 on the component Download Chart.)	A Page
"Bonnie & Clyde"	2021	—	— (Note: "Bonnie & Clyde" did not enter the Gaon Digital Chart but peaked at number 68 on the component Download Chart.)	A Page
"Could It Be"	2024	62	— (Note: "Could It Be" did not enter the Circle Digital Chart but peaked at number 44 on the component Download Chart.)	Yuq1
"Freak"	2024	43	153	Yuq1
"Radio (Dum-Dum)"	2025	14	— (Note: "Radio (Dum-Dum)" did not enter the Circle Digital Chart but peaked at number 27 on the component Download Chart.)	Non-album singles
"Fendi"	2025	—	—	Non-album singles
"COPDD"	2025	44	—	Non-album singles
"M.O."	2025	8	159	Motivation
"One Last Rain" (雨终曲) (With Silence Wang)	2026	17	—	联名2
"Stay"	2026	18	—	27 (二十七)
"—" denotes releases that did not chart or were not released in that region.

==== As featured artist ====
Title	Year	Peak chart positions		Album
Title	Year	CHN	KOR	Album
"Hate Rodrigo" (Choi Ye-na featuring Yuqi)	2023	—	117	Hate XX
"Fire!" (Alan Walker featuring Yuqi and Jvke)	2023	—	— (Note: "Fire!" did not enter the Circle Digital Chart but peaked at number 143 on the component Download Chart.)	Walkerworld 2.0
"Drive U Crazy" (Minnie featuring Yuqi)	2025	— (Note: "Drive U Crazy" did not enter the TME Uni Chart but peaked at number 11 on the China Korean Chart.)	41	Her
"Fly to the Youth" (Chinese version) (Nowz featuring Yuqi)	2025	84	—	Ignition
"—" denotes releases that did not chart or were not released in that region.

=== Soundtrack appearances ===
Title	Year	Peak chart positions		Album
Title	Year	CHN	KOR	Album
"造亿万吨光芒" (with Angelababy, Li Chen, Zheng Kai, Zhu Yawen, Wang Yanlin, and Lucas Wong)	2019	—	—	Keep Running OST
"Happy Seasoning" (开心调味计)	2019	—	—	Please Pay Attention Visitors OST
"VVS" (with Stage Boom casts)	2021	68	—	Stage Boom OST
"Sweet Dream" (with Miyeon)	2023	—	— (Note: "Sweet Dream" did not enter the Circle Digital Chart but peaked at number 97 on the component Download Chart.)	Love to Hate You OST Part 1
"Not Cinderella" (with HypeerTime)	2023	—	—	I Wasn't the Cinderella OST Part 1
"How to Twerk" (트윌ㅋ) (produced by Czaer; with Miyeon)	2023	—	85	Street Woman Fighter 2 OST Part 2
"Making Waves" (造浪)	2023	—	—	Rising With the Wind OST
"Bad Liar" (연극)	2024	—	— (Note: "Bad Liar" did not enter the Circle Digital Chart but peaked at number 83 on the component Download Chart.)	Marry My Husband OST
"Circumference and Waning" (圆缺)	2026	81	—	A Century of the Palace Museum OST
"—" denotes releases that did not chart or were not released in that region.

=== Other charted songs ===
Title	Year	Peak chart positions		Album
Title	Year	CHN	US World	Album
"Gone" (아프다)	2025	—	9	Motivation
"Gone" (Chinese version; 还痛吗)	2025	28	—	Motivation
"Sadness" (快乐)	2026	14	—	27 (二十七)
"Chamomile Tea"	2026	30	—	27 (二十七)
"I Like You"	2026	22	—	27 (二十七)
"Feels Right"	2026	34	—	27 (二十七)
"Dance of The Galaxy" (银河之舞)	2026	17	—	27 (二十七)
"—" denotes releases that did not chart or were not released in that region.

=== Composition credits ===
All song credits are adapted from the Korea Music Copyright Association's database, unless otherwise noted.

Title	Year	Artist	Album	Composer	Lyricist	Ref.
"Dumdi Dumdi" (Chinese version)	2020	(G)I-dle	Dumdi Dumdi	No	Yes	
"I'm the Trend"	2020	(G)I-dle	Dumdi Dumdi	Yes	Yes	—N/a
"Lost"	2021	(G)I-dle	I Burn	Yes	Yes	—N/a
"Hwaa" (Chinese version)	2021	(G)I-dle	I Burn	No	Yes	
"Giant"	2021	Yuqi	A Page	Yes	Yes	—N/a
"Polaroid"	2022	(G)I-dle	I Never Die	Yes	Yes	—N/a
"Liar"	2022	(G)I-dle	I Never Die	Yes	Yes	—N/a
"Rain" (소나기)	2022	Miyeon	My	Yes	No	—N/a
"Reset"	2022	(G)I-dle	I Love	Yes	No	—N/a
"Dark (X-File)"	2022	(G)I-dle	I Love	Yes	No	—N/a
"All Night"	2023	(G)I-dle	I Feel	Yes	Yes	—N/a
"Peter Pan" (어린 어른)	2023	(G)I-dle	I Feel	Yes	Yes	—N/a
"Doll"	2024	(G)I-dle	2	Yes	Yes	—N/a
"Rollie"	2024	(G)I-dle	2	Yes	Yes	—N/a
"Freak"	2024	Yuqi	Yuq1	Yes	Yes	—N/a
"My Way"	2024	Yuqi	Yuq1	Yes	Yes	—N/a
"Drink It Up" (feat. pH-1)	2024	Yuqi	Yuq1	Yes	Yes	—N/a
"On Clap" (feat. Lexie Liu)	2024	Yuqi	Yuq1	No	Yes	—N/a
"Everytime" (feat. Minnie)	2024	Yuqi	Yuq1	Yes	Yes	—N/a
"Last Forever"	2024	(G)I-dle	I Sway	Yes	Yes	—N/a
"Neverland"	2024	(G)I-dle	I Sway	Yes	Yes	—N/a
"Radio (Dum-Dum)"	2025	Yuqi	Non-album singles	Yes	Yes	—N/a
"Fendi"	2025	Yuqi	Non-album singles	Yes	Yes	—N/a
"Love Tease"	2025	I-dle	We Are	Yes	Yes	—N/a
"Fly to the Youth" (자유롭게 날아)	2025	NOWZ	Ignition	Yes	Yes	—N/a
"M.O."	2025	Yuqi	Motivation	Yes	Yes	—N/a
"Gone" (아프다)	2025	Yuqi	Motivation	Yes	Yes	—N/a
"Gone" (Chinese version; 还痛吗)	2025	Yuqi	Motivation	Yes	Yes	—N/a
"Love Is Pain"	2026	I-dle	We Made	Yes	Yes	—N/a

== Videography ==
=== Music videos ===
Title	Year	Director(s)	Ref.
"Giant"	2021	Tezo Don Lee (Tjoff Koong Studios London)	
"Bonnie and Clyde"	2021	Neo Young (Club Media)	
"Could It Be"	2024	Jimmy (Via Production)	
"Freak"	2024	Samson (Highqualityfish)	
"Radio (Dum-Dum)"	2024	Jimmy (Via Production)	
"Gone" (아프다)	2025	Jimmy (Via Production)	
"M.O."	2025	Lafic	
"I Like You"	2026	Unknown	
"Stay"	2026	Jimmy (Via Production)	

== Filmography ==
=== Web series ===
Year	Title	Role	Notes	Ref.
2023	Celebrity	Zhang Wei	Cameo (Ep. 8–9)	

=== Television shows ===
Year	Title	Role	Notes	Ref.
2019–present	Keep Running	Cast member		
2019	The Gashinas	Cast member		
2019	Law of the Jungle in Myanmar	Cast member		
2020	I'm a Survivor	Cast member		
2020	King of Mask Singer	Contestant	As "Pineapple Pizza" (Episode 279)	
2020	Play Seoul	Tour guide	Hip Street Tour	
2020	Seoul Connects U	Tour guide		
2021	Stage Boom	Contestant		
2021	请吃饭的姐姐	Cast member		
2021	Let's Fall In Love 3	Cast member		
2021	2060	Cast member		
2021	Shine! Super Brothers	Host		
2025	I'm Sunny Thank You	Host		

=== Web shows ===
Year	Title	Role	Notes	Ref.
2020	The First Date	Cast member		
2020	Learn Way	Host	Season 1	
2020	G-Star 2020 - Krafton	Cast member		
2020	My Dream Is Ryan	Special students	Episode 14–16	
2022	Zero-Sum Game	Host		
2023	Star Girl	Cast member		

== Awards and nominations ==
Name of the award ceremony, year presented, category, nominee of the award, and the result of the nomination
Award ceremony	Year	Category	Nominee / Work	Result	Ref.
Asia Artist Awards	2025	Popularity Award – Solo	Yuqi	Won	
Tencent Music Entertainment Awards	2025	Influential Dance Artist of the Year	Yuqi	Won	
Tencent Music Entertainment Awards	2025	Chinese Digital EP of the Year	Yuq1	Won	
MAMA Awards	2025	Artist of the Year	Yuqi	Nominated	
MAMA Awards	2025	Best Female Artist	Yuqi	Nominated	
