= HITC =

British news and entertainment website

- Website type: Football news
- Available in: English
- Headquarters: {{{location_country}}}
- Area served: Worldwide
- Owner: GRV Media
- Key people: Vic Daniels (co-founder and Executive Chairman); Graham Morris (co-founder and CEO); Robi Buckley (co-founder)
- Website: hitc.com
- Advertising: Native
- Registration: No
- Launched: 2000; 26 years ago
- Current status: Active

HITC (formerly Here Is the City) is a British sport news website owned by GRV Media. Formerly a news and entertainment site with a sport section, HITC switched its focus to sport in 2023, with football its primary topic.

As well as multiple social profiles, it also has two popular football-themed YouTube channels, HITC Football (previously HITC Sport) and HITC Sevens, launched in October 2014 and June 2017, respectively.

== History ==
At its launch in 2000, HITC was focused on financial news.

In February 2010 it set up a "Save Dave" campaign to save a banker from losing their job after they were caught on live television viewing images of a model in the office. The campaign garnered much publicity within the finance industry.

The company dropped the name Here Is the City in 2015 and rebranded to HITC.

In December 2023 the website streamlined its news content to focus specifically on football and hired Graeme Bailey as Strategic & Operational Head of Football.

The HITC Football (previously HITC Sport) and HITC Sevens YouTube channels were launched in October 2014 and June 2017, respectively. As of the end of 2021, the channels have a combined subscriber base of over 1 million. HITC Football was previously run by Michael Ramsay, who left in 2022 to launch his own channel, The Irish Guy.

HITC Sevens was run by Alfie Potts Harmer. His six-month-old blog A Halftime Report won the judges' award for Best Young Blogger at the 2015 Football Blogging Awards. This was decided by a distinguished panel including Dan Walker of BBC Sport, John Cross of the Daily Mirror, Neil Ashton of the Daily Mail and Owen Gibson of The Guardian. Alfie left the channel to go independent on 11 September 2026, having handed his notice in towards the end of August.
