= Newtro culture =

South Korean portmanteau and trend

Newtro (Korean: 뉴트로) is a portmanteau of the words "new" and "retro", and refers to the trend of "modernized retro". Newtro's beginnings can be traced back to 2018 in South Korea.

Newtro is an amalgamation of trends of the modern and retro eras (namely, the 1980s and 1990s) in all fields of life, such as fashion, music, movies, beverages, food, architecture, electronics, etc. Newtro is not only a nostalgic pass-time aimed for middle aged but also a source of entertainment for the younger generation. This aspect is very different from the standard retro (which is simply recreating the objects from the past). Newtro is presented by modern sense (i.e. interpretation, not representation).

This culture rose to popularity in South Korea in the year 2019, and is still popular today.

== Popularization ==
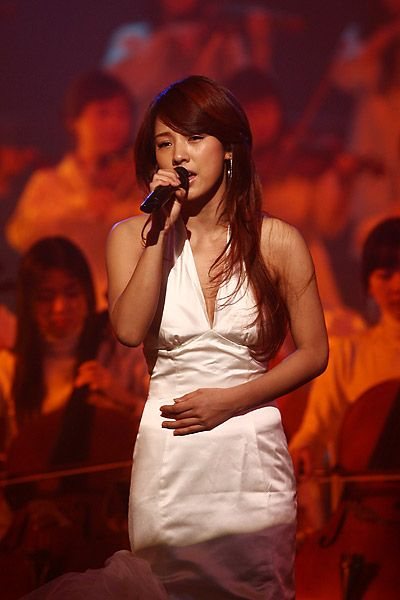
South Korean singer Lee Hyori on Inkigayo in 2007

With the shifting South Korean demographic turning to comprise mostly of 30- to 50-year-old individuals, media and marketing cater to the audience of this age group by making more TV shows with the Newtro concept. Companies are also reintroducing snacks and beverages with old packaging design, clothing, and past trends.

Period dramas set in 19th and 20th centuries, like Mr.Sunshine, Reply 1997, Reply 1994, and Reply 1988 have all influenced the rise of Newtro. These dramas often use historical names, such as Hanseong, the original name of the capital city of South Korea, Seoul. These dramas often show the late 1980s or 1990s Korean time period to viewers. These dramas are highly popular among domestic and international audiences. YouTube opened opportunities to view past programs more easily, rather than waiting for reruns. This increased the viewership for TV programs which were popular in 1990s and 2000s. Family sitcoms like "Unstoppable High Kicks", musical programs, such as "Inkigayo", and more are the highlights of Newtro on YouTube. Social media has also been an influence. Posting photographs and trending hashtags on social media apps such as Instagram attracted more visitors to Newtro themed cafes and streets, and increased the consumption of Newtro products.

Media scholars and cultural observers note that these media works, consumer products, and design trends evoked nostalgia among older generations while introducing retro cultural elements to younger demographics.

Newtro, in turn, became a bridge between the older and younger generations. Foods or snacks of the older generations became available for the younger generations, and these retro-style foods, as well as media, became a conversation starter between the generations, thus, reducing the generation gap. It is a way to create inter-generational rapport and generational integration beyond the curiosity of the memory consumption of the older generations and the retro of the young generation.

Expert Lee Jun-young, Prof. of Consumer Economics, Sangmyung University believes Newtro is very popular in South Korea since there are no limit to new content relating to Newtro. As such, Newtro products meet demand and are likely to continue to evolve and last far longer than other trends.

Rising social, economic and health issues, falling human happiness index, and strong nostalgic feelings in the fast-paced Korean society are increasing the craving for an era that was devoid of such concerns, thus also giving rise to Newtro culture.

== Examples ==
=== Technology ===
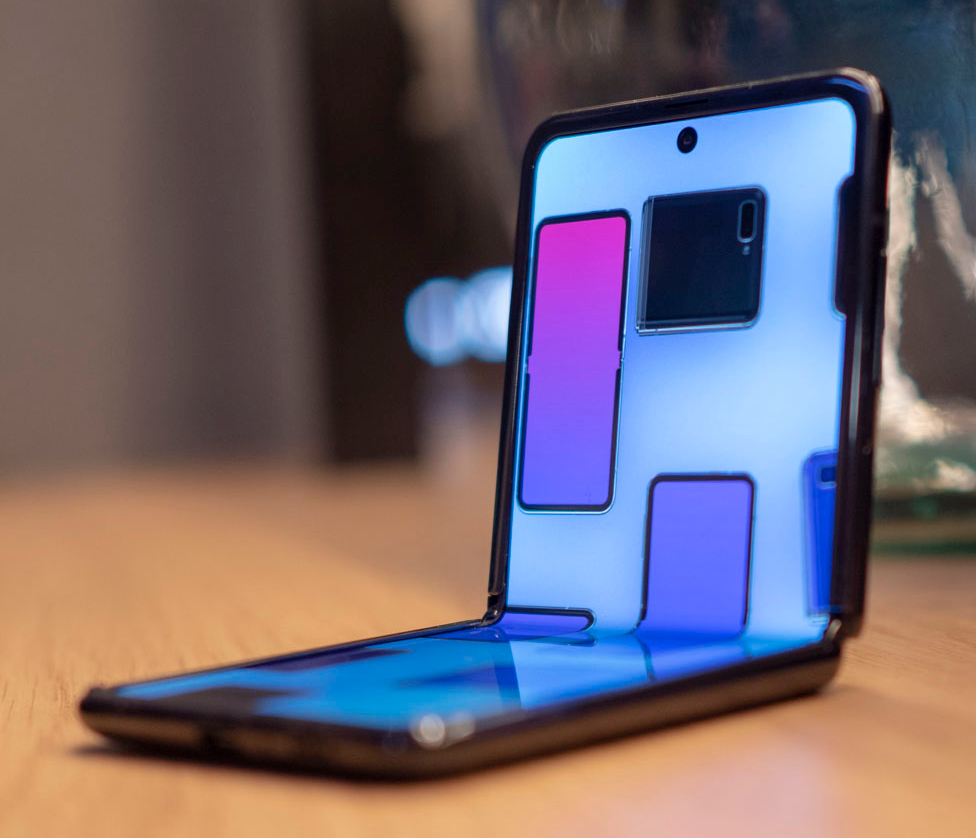
A Samsung Galaxy Z Flip. These combine the "retro" flip phone with the modern touchscreen.

Samsung's Z Flip were reintroduced. These were popular in 2000s.

The home appliance industryis targeting customers by increasing the lineup of Newtro designs; items such as refrigerators, washing machines, and water purifiers have been redesigned.

=== Architecture and design ===
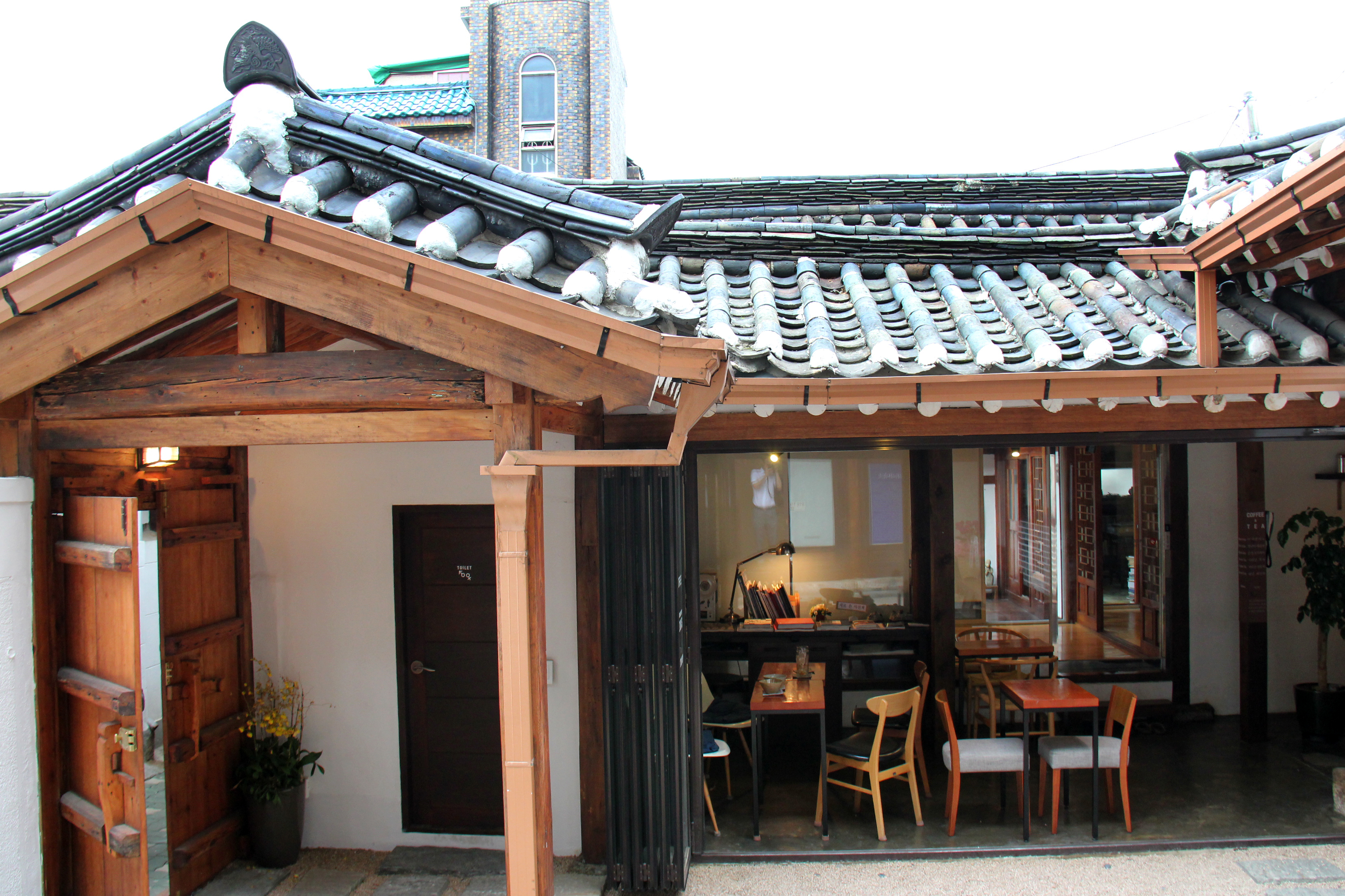
Hanok Cafe at Tongui-dong, Jongno-gu, Seoul, Korea

Newtro has bolstered the historical Hanok architecture and style in the modern age.

Hanok is the traditional Korean housing built and designed in the 14th century during the Joseon dynasty. In the modern times, with the fast-changing Korea, Hanok has not lost its appeal, which lead to the incorporation of certain characteristic features of Hanok into modern homes and living spaces.

Many cafes are incorporating retro-inspired decors and furniture, often called Hanok (Hangul: 한옥) or a cafe/Dabang (Hangul: 다방)). More Dabang (traditional Korean coffee houses) styled cafes are appearing in cities. Most Hanok cafes maintain the external appearance and general structure of a traditional Hanok, while still having modern interiors.

Retro style arcades have also adapted the Newtro look. Nintendo and Tencent have both released games that feature their retro jasses. Kom Kom Arcade gives an option to play games from the 80s and 90s, and the arcade is seen in the K-drama When the Camellia Blooms.

Eulji-ro (Korean: downtown Seoul, named after the general Ŭlchi Mundŏk offers an industrial, historical taste of Korea with historical machine and tool shops, printing shops, and traditional houses being renovated into restaurants which store a mix of traditional interior design with modem eateries and bakeries.

=== General economics ===
There is a surge in the number of Koreans wanting to experience a different era, a popular activity for Korean couples that has led to the opening of new markets and business.

In downtown Seoul, there are dozens of boutique shops that rent out clothes, dresses, suits and accessories from the late 19th century to the early 20th century for a few hours. Customers can take selfies either inside or outside the shop. These shops are thriving, since demand for 1930s and 40s styles are also rising. Many retail uniform rental shops are available in Hanok villages.

Releasing (non-consumable) products or goods in retro style has also surged in popularity among businesses in South Korea. For example, Daehan Flower, a flower company which had been in the market for almost 80 years prior, expanded its market by selling Newtro style goods using their brand characters as advertisements, attracting customers in their 20s and 30s. Accessories used in 90s are also gaining popularity: plastic bead key-chains, phone decorating stickers, board games, Polaroid cameras, and traditional hair pins with modern designs all have been making a comeback.

Dongmyo Market, Jongno-gu Dist., Seoul, which was popular among the elderly, is now visited by a younger population.

=== Fashion ===
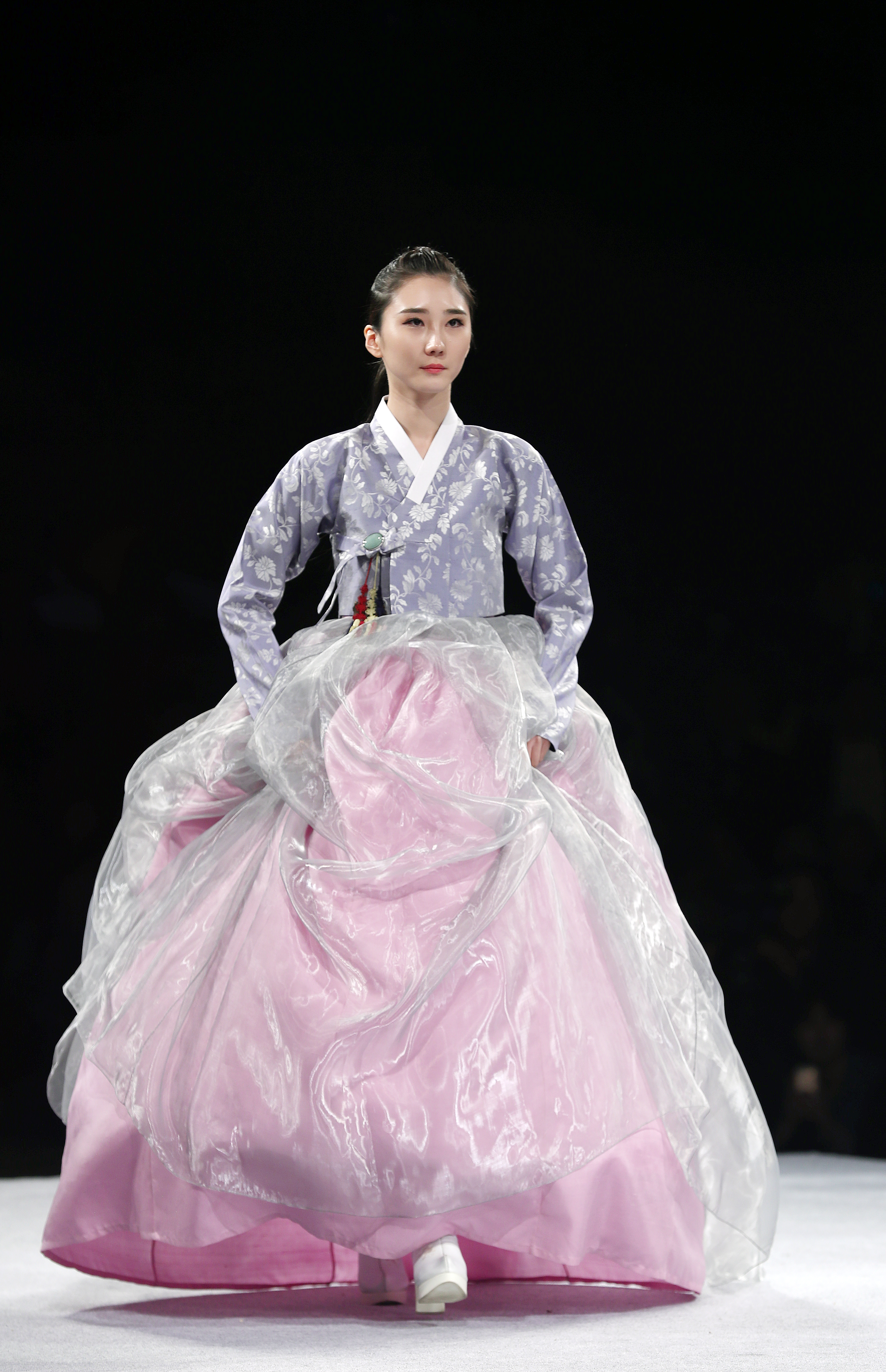
Hanbok clothing on a female

The Newtro trend has brought back clothes, footwear, accessories from the past three decades. Bell-bottom pants, bold prints, vintage boomer jackets, baggy jeans are back in style.

Modern "Hanbok" clothing usually refers to traditional Korean clothes worn during the Joseon dynasty period. It has been transformed into modern Hanbok-esque, while still keeping intact the key features of traditional Korean clothing. The Newtro clothing has been a rising trend with the help of K-pop artists like VIXX, BTS, A.C.E, Blackpink, ONEUS, etc., who featured adorning these modern versions in their music video concepts, season's greetings, concept photos, etc.

The ‘2018 F/W Hera Seoul Fashion Week’ held at Dongdaemun Design Plaza in October 2018 saw the reappearance of fashion popular which was 30 years back. In November 2019, Zijangsa (Hangul: 지장사) Modernized Hanbok, a small brand that makes comfortable, wearable Hanbok, experienced an unexpected surge in order, causing them to be sold out on their official site after artists like BTS's Jungkook and V wore hanbok of their brand. Many stores and brands like Leesle, Danha Seoul offer modern Hanboks. Fila released a remake shoe line from the 1970s which has been selling steadily, with sales of more than 500,000 pairs.

Makeup companies like Clio, Romand, Peripera, Stonebrick are releasing limited edition makeup in retro style along with making the package look like VHS tapes and cassettes to give it a retro look. Makeup trends from the 80s to the early 2000s are also back in fashion.

Since, October 2020 Korean schools have started incorporating Hanbok-inspired uniforms; which was introduced by Hanbok Advanced Center.

=== Media ===
MBC is now "re-debuting" the superstars of 1990s and 2000s- Rain, Lee Hyo-ri and Yoo Jae-suk were all re-released as a" mixed group".

Even in the digital age there is growing demand for LP stores. LP stores in Yongsan-gu district, Seoul, allow visitors to listen to and buy LP records. 1,500 people visit every day. In South Korea, an estimated 600,000 copies of LPs were sold in 2019; more than double compared to 2016.

Newtro trends can also be seen in the K-pop group DIA's mini-album titled after the trend; it features some 1980s- and 1990s-inspired styling and fashion to add to the numerous other K-pop artists who incorporated Newtro idea into their work. BTS' hit single "Dynamite", recounts familiar scenes and fashion from the early 1970s. BTS also released exclusive vinyl records and cassettes instead of the usual CD. Since the 2020s, there has been a rise in k-pop groups coming up with a jewel case version of newly released albums, especially associated with SM Entertainment.

=== Food and drink ===
Newtro culture has brought back retro packaging and redesigns to various food and drink products.

One company has re-launched a type of noodles 30 years after they were originally on the market. Old time snacks have also made a comeback; snacks like Samyang's Star Popeye snack, Lotte's Juicy & Fresh Gum, Lotte's Cheetos, Gompyo's popcorn and Gompyo's nachos.

Gompyo, also redesigned their beer packaging with 90s elements and used their original logo due to Newtro culture. Jinro soju bottle released their previous version of 1970s & 1980s and since its released in April; sales of those have hit like over 100 million units in 7 months. 70s version of Soju (Kumbokju's Soju King, Muhak and Jinro) have made their comeback with original packaging, logos and taste. The old transparent bottle caught up fast as the younger generation prefers them more than the current Soju coming in green bottles. One beer company has used its old bear character (used back in 1950s) and retro style fonts on its packaging.

=== Newtro streets ===
Newtro is not centered on a particular store, product, or activity alone. Remodeled, renovated, developed streets following the Newtro trend has been identified by the Korean Tourism Organization (KTO). These places are not foreign to local Koreans; some places have profound historical significance and are included in local "walk in Korea" programs, as well as tourist travel plans. On top of that, alleyways being reconstructed with a late 1900s appearance are also popular and are pulling in visitors.

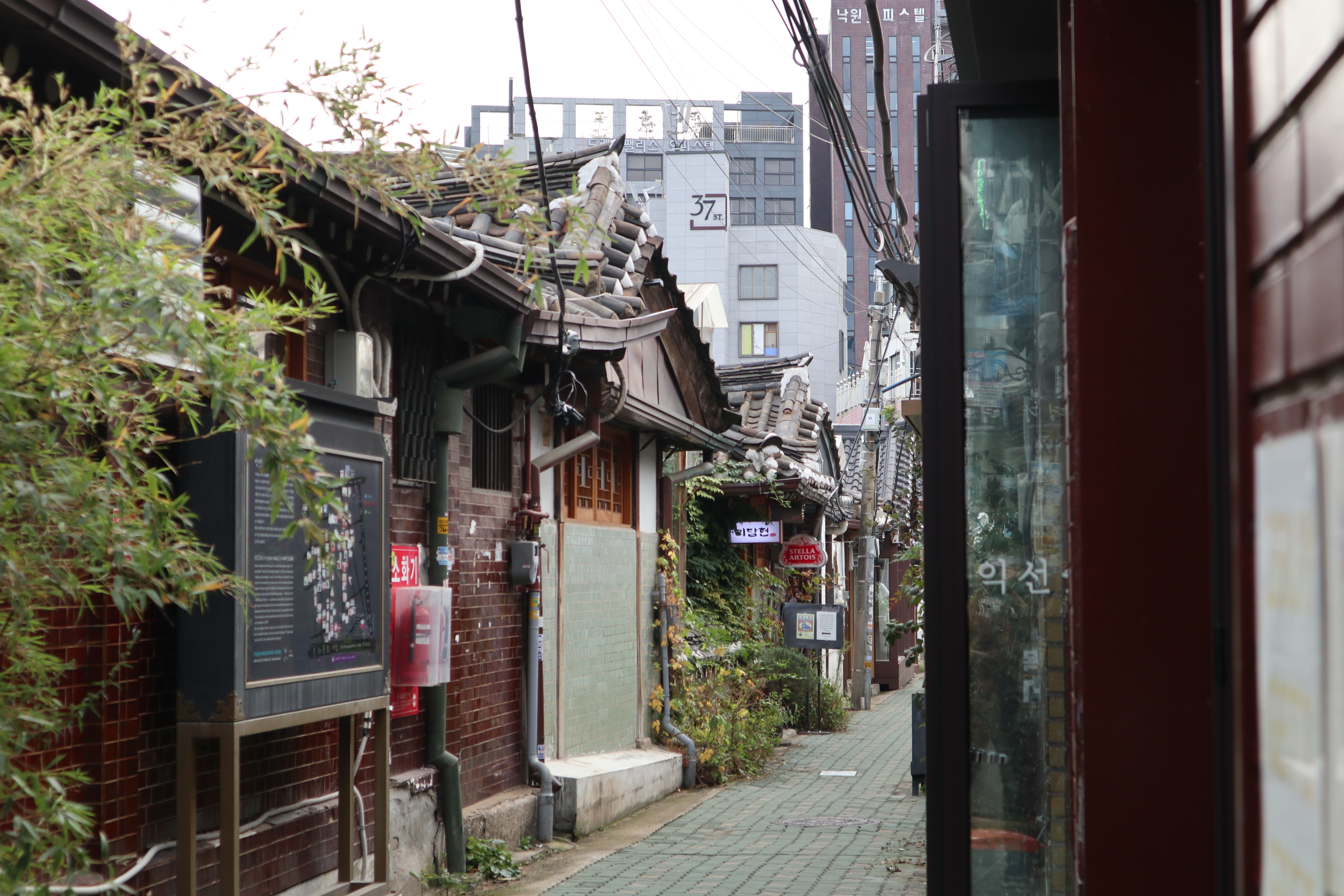
Ikseon-dong Hanok village

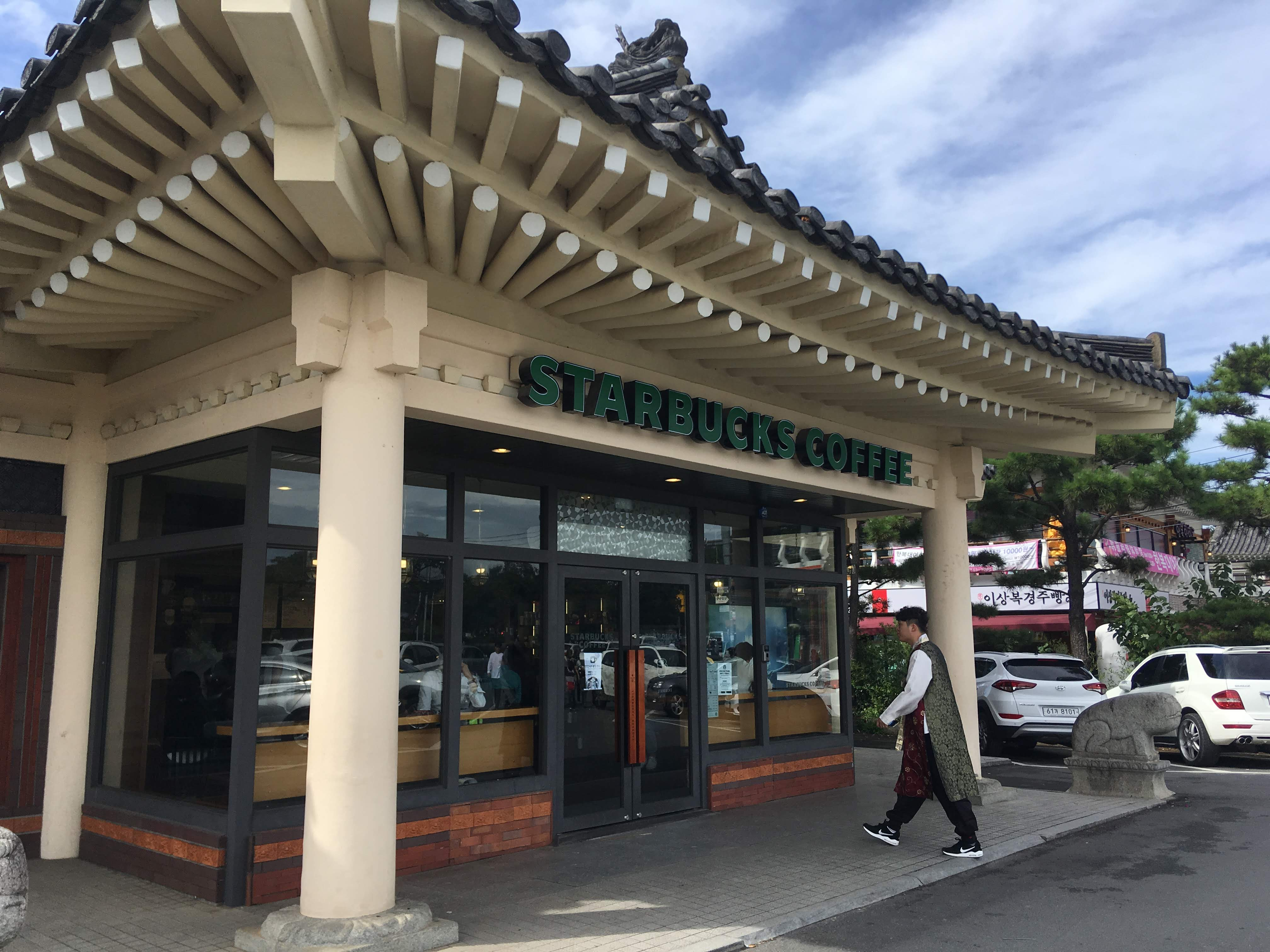
Starbucks Coffee in Gyeongju

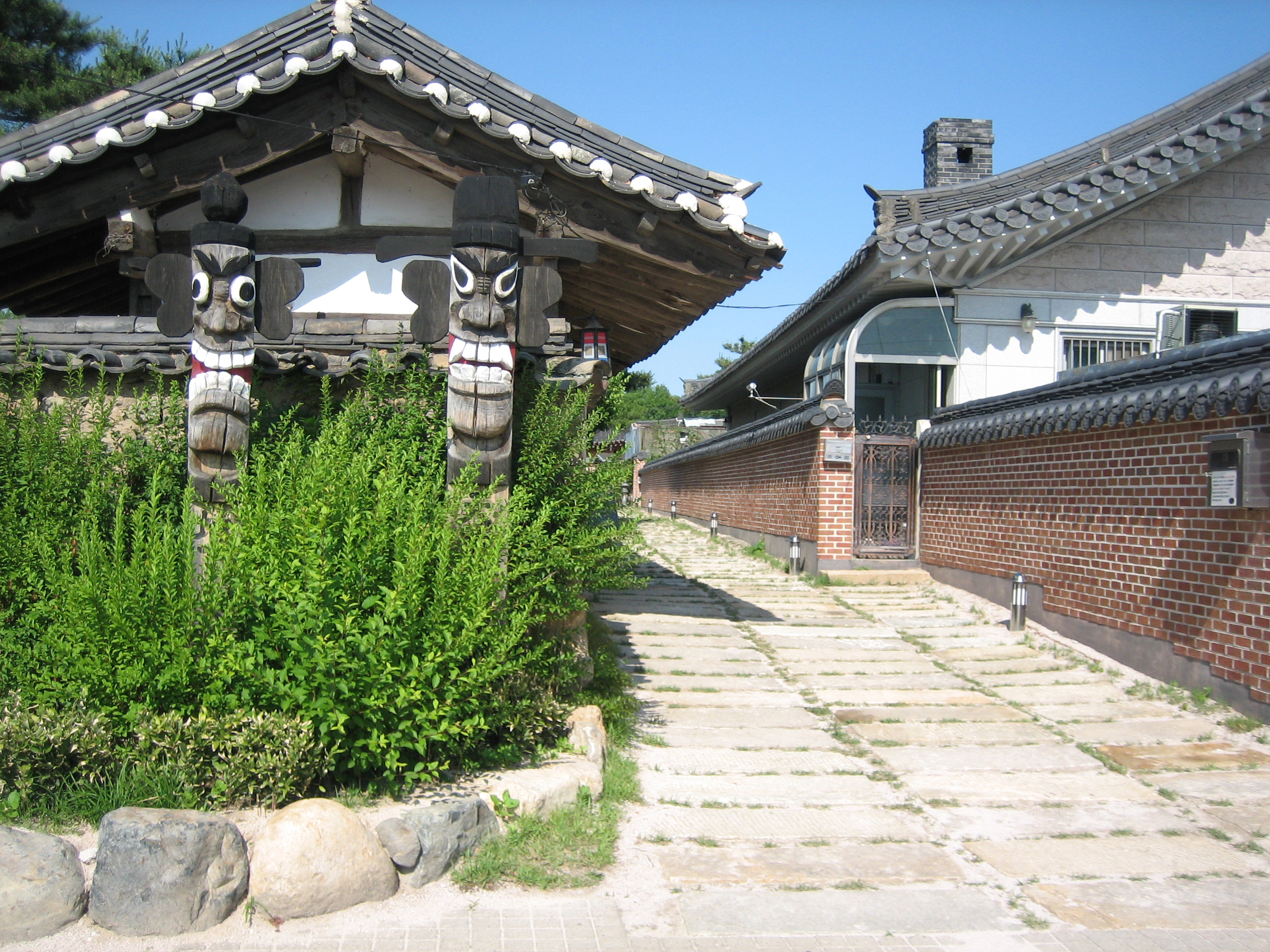
A Hanok and alley in Gyeongju

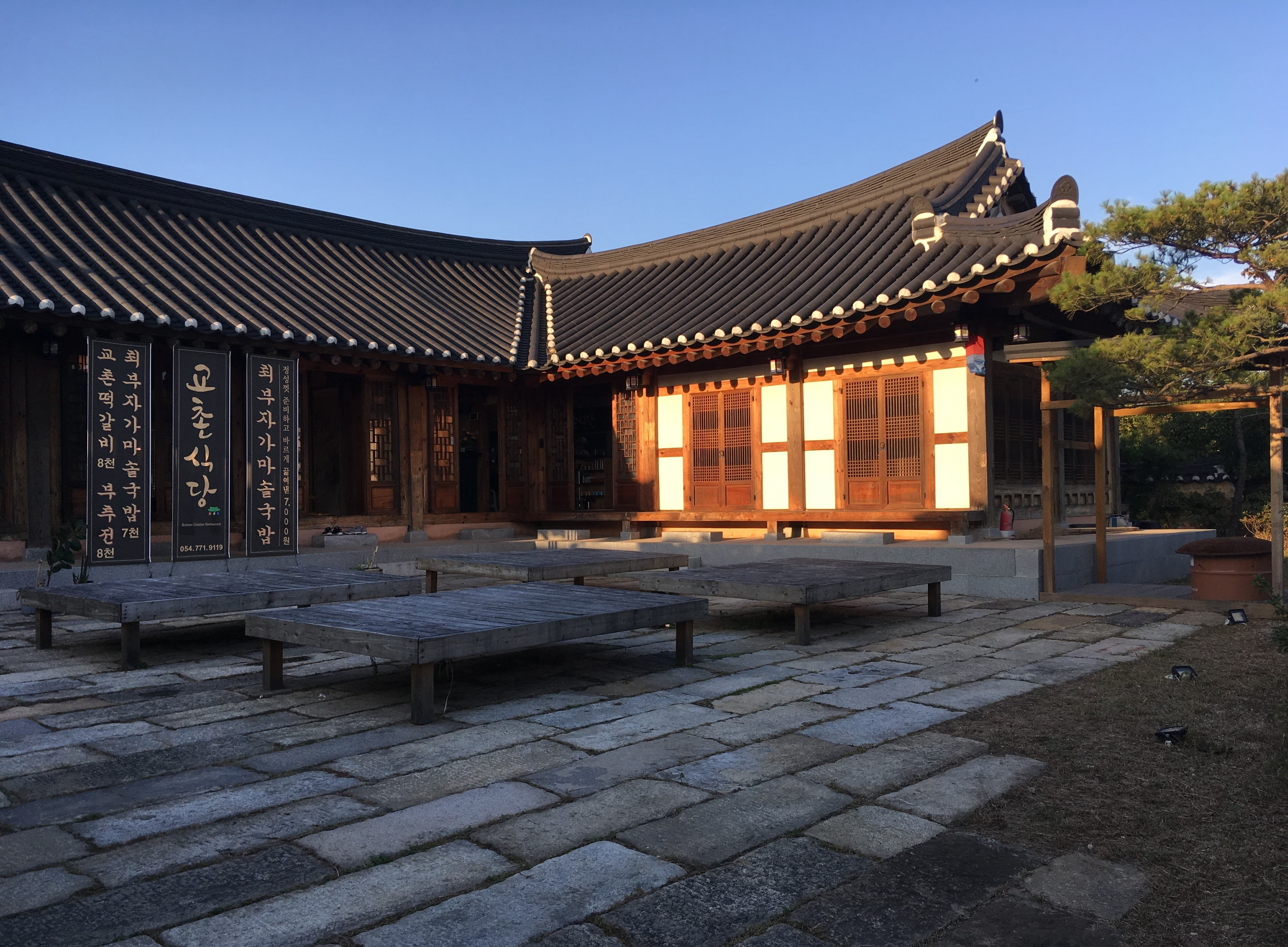
Restaurant in the Gyochon Village, Gyeongju

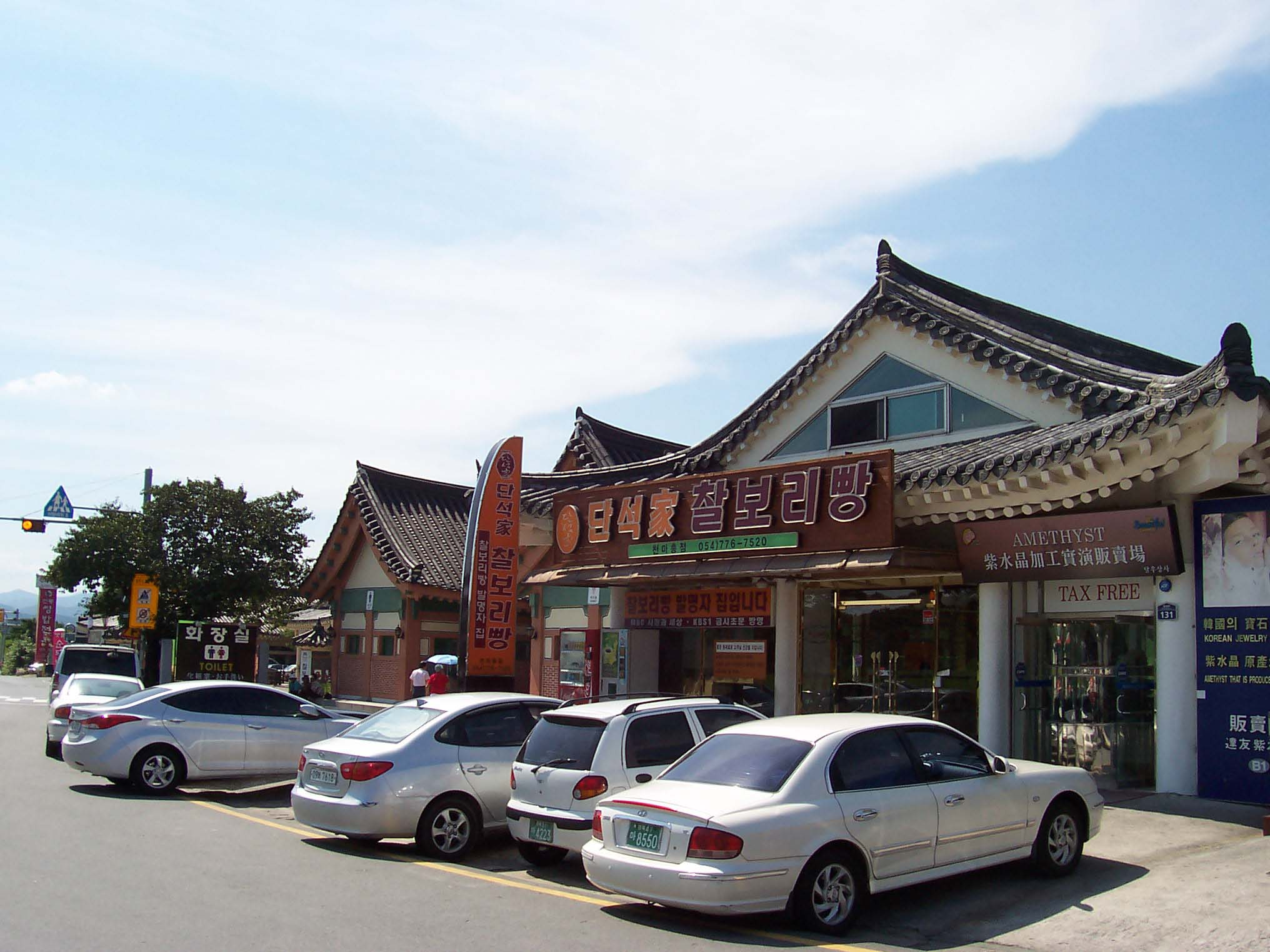
Restaurants near Gyeongju historical areas

Ikseon-dong, Seoul
In the middle of Seoul, this area of narrow alleys lined with Hanoks built in the 1920s showcase the beauty of traditional Korean architecture. The Hanoks were renovated, merging the traditional architecture with modern culture. These buildings serve as restaurants, pubs, cafes, and Korean-style bars. Many of these houses still have people living in them. Places popular with tourists include:

- Ikseondong Ssal Sanghoe: sells unique Hotteok, a traditional Korean dessert;
- Assibabgagan, a shop adorned with accessories and ornaments along with antique furniture and customized scented products;
- Uncle Videotown, a cafe which provides coffee & snacks along with cinema.

Euljiro-dong, Seoul
Euljiro is a road that connects Seoul City Hall to Dongdaemun History & Culture Park. This area of Seoul is home to a maze of alleys once dotted with iron foundries and print shops. However, this decades-old district started making changes with the rise of Newtro. Keeping up with the times, this area earned the nickname "Hipji-ro", as the shops that may still look old and outdated from the outside showcase an interior that is nothing short of being hip and trendy. Furthermore, in the middle of the business district, the food street "Nogari Alley", selected as "Seoul Future Heritage" site in 2015, houses restaurants and bars specializing in beer and nogari. Seun Sangga, outside of Nogari Alley, after renovation, has become a popular spot for taking pictures of Seoul's city lights; Jan-a Cafe and Bar (lit. Cup Cafe and Bar) exemplifies the essence of Newtro. They enables customers to select their vintage cup before ordering a drink. Euliro's Sweeon Arcade houses many coffee shops, most notably Tiger Coffee. Coffee Hanyakbang is a traditional dabang style herbal medicine shop and cafe dating back to a 16th-century court physician. Manseon hof, Uhwa Sikdang, Eulki Myun Oak are also popular with the rise of Newtro.

Gaehang-Ro, Incheon
Incheon, the nearest port city to Seoul, and is home to the Newtro street Gaehang-ro. It is known for its vintage decor and aesthetic. Old buildings were given new life and transformed into new establishments; a former otolaryngology clinic became a cafe; an old gynecology clinic was remodeled into a lighting store; a tailor shop transformed into a gallery, and a 100-year-old house was converted into a fried chicken restaurant. Gaehangro Tongdak, a representative retro restaurant, takes people back in time to show how chicken restaurants looked in the past. Ganhang Noodles and Browns turned a remodeled old hospital into a vintage-style cafe.

Soje-dong, Daejeon
Around 100 years ago, housing for employees of the Japanese Railroad Bureau was built in Soje-dong. Today, these houses have been renovated for new purposes such as restaurants. Popularity of Newtro has led to the revitalization of the Soje-dong neighborhood railway station village behind Daejeon Station. In particular, some places were transformed into an Italian restaurant serving dishes made from local ingredients, a tea house with a bamboo forest, and a cafe that has successfully recreated the taste of coffee from the early 1900s. Trendy cafes remodeled a 70-year-old inn. Cafes and restaurants remodeled old Hanoks with interiors popular with the youth in their 20s and 30s, yet are still able to stimulate nostalgia in the middle aged population in their 50s and 60s.

Choryang-dong, Busan
Choryang-dong, which was home to refugees of the Korean War, has welcomed many visitors after Busan's first modem building and Japanese style house were renovated into cafes. Baekje Hospital, Busan's first western styled hospital built in the 1920s was rebirthed as cafe. Visitors enjoy this area by walking through Ibagu-gil, a narrow street that stretches about 1.5 km across the old town. A 60 m long monorail with 168 stairs, which was built to climb the mid-slope of the mountains where the village is built, is used by the refugees.

Hwangnidan-gil, Gyeongju
After serving as the capital city of the Silla Kingdom for nearly 1,000 years (57BCE-935CE), Hwangnidan-gil Street in Gyeongju is lined with numerous Hanok-style cafés, unique restaurants, and bars. Among them is a rooftop cafe that offers visitors a view of the Hanok skyline and large, ancient tombs.

Donuimun Museum Village
The Saemunan neighborhood, where Donuimun Museum Village stands today, was designated for demolition, but was then later preserved, as the neighborhood holds historical value. The reconstructed buildings in the museum complex have exhibitions and activities ranging from the Joseon dynasty; Saemunan Theater, showing classic movies from that era; accessible arcade games such as Tetris and Space Invaders, and Seodaemun Photo studio, with equipment enabling the replication of Korean Empire 1970s-1980s wedding photoshoots. Various stores on the museum grounds include snack shops, old-style general stores, book cafes, dabang style coffee houses, LP bars, traditional tea houses, etc.

Youth 1st Avenue, Seoul
Youth 1st Avenue is a recreation of the street back in 60s and 70s. Stored adorned with fronts and signs styled in Newtro, as well as a place where artisans sell handcrafted goods under the city's innovation project dot the street. Antique stores, theatre, dabang, old-styled coffee house, Newtro themed arcades, music dabang with LP records can also be found there.

== Criticism ==
There are also criticisms of the Newtro phenomenon. With great emphasis on the Newtro trend, more and more people end up consuming Newtro culture, leading to concerns that are being overlooked due to economic gains. Professor Kyun-Sik Jang of the Department of History at Chung-Ang University pointed out the dangers of consuming the Newtro culture without historical awareness. Some are concerned that the area which become a Newtro Landmark only borrows tradition as a commercial concept, but loses its original identity.

== See also ==
- 1980s retro
